The Catalogue of paintings in the National Gallery, London is the collection catalog listing the paintings of the National Gallery, London collection, as they were catalogued in 2010 by the Public Catalogue Foundation. The collection contains roughly 2,300 paintings by 750 artists, and only attributed artists are listed here. Painters with more than twenty works in the collection are Jean-Baptiste-Camille Corot, Carlo Crivelli, Anthony van Dyck, Francesco Guardi, Rembrandt van Rijn, Peter Paul Rubens, Jacob van Ruisdael, and David Teniers II. The only women artists with works in the collection are Artemisia Gentileschi, Marie Blancour, Rosa Bonheur, Rosalba Giovanna Carriera, Catharina van Hemessen, Judith Leyster, Rachel Ruysch, and Elisabeth Louise Vigée-LeBrun. The only British artists with works in the collection are William Boxall, John Constable, Thomas Gainsborough, William Hogarth, John Hoppner, John Callcott Horsley, John Jackson, Thomas Jones, Cornelis Janssens van Ceulen, Thomas Lawrence, John Linnell, Henry Raeburn, Joshua Reynolds, Martin Archer Shee, George Stubbs, Joseph Mallord William Turner, Richard Wilson, and Joseph Wright of Derby.  However, because of the historical links between the National Gallery and its offshoot in the 19th century, Tate Britain, the National has in the past transferred and recalled works by British artists to and from its collection.

Some artists are represented in the collection with more than six artworks, but only a maximum of six per name are listed here.

A
Hans von Aachen (1552–1614) (YP) : The Amazement of the Gods (YP)
Niccolò dell'Abbate (1509–1571) (YP) : The Death of Eurydice (YP)
Johannes van der Aeck (1636–1682) (YP) : An Old Woman seated sewing (YP)
Pieter Coecke van Aelst (1502–1550) (YP) : Donatrix: Right Hand Shutter (YP), Donor: Left Hand Shutter (YP), The Archangel Gabriel: reverse of left-hand shutter (YP), The Crucifixion: Central Panel (YP), The Virgin and Child Enthroned (YP), The Virgin Annunciate: reverse of right-hand shutter (YP)
Andrea di Aloigi (1480–1521) (YP) : The Virgin and Child (YP)
Albrecht Altdorfer (1480–1538) (YP) : Christ taking Leave of his Mother (YP) and Landscape with a Footbridge (YP)
Jan van Amstel (c. 1500–1540) (YP) : Itinerant Entertainers in a Brothel (YP)
Andrea di Bonaiuto da Firenze (active 1343–1377) (YP) : The Virgin and Child with Ten Saints (YP)
Pierre Andrieu (1821–1892) (YP) : Still Life with Fruit and Flowers (YP)
Fra Angelico (1387–1455) (YP) : Christ Glorified in the Court of Heaven: central panel (YP), Saint Romulus: frame panel (YP), The Dominican Blessed: outer left panel (YP), The Dominican Blessed: outer right panel (YP), The Forerunners of Christ with Saints and Martyrs (YP), The Virgin Mary with the Apostles and Other Saints (YP)
Antonello da Messina (1430–1479) (YP) : Christ Blessing (YP), Christ Crucified (YP), Portrait of a Man (YP), St. Jerome in His Study (YP), Salting Madonna (YP)
Apollonio di Giovanni di Tommaso (ca. 1414–1465) (YP) : Desco da parto (YP)
Arent Arentsz (1585–1631) (YP) : Fishermen near Muiden Castle (YP)
Spinello Aretino (1330–1410) (YP) : Decorative Border (YP), Decorative Border (YP), Saint Michael and Other Angels (YP), Two Haloed Mourners (YP)
Bernardino da Asola (c.1490–1540) (YP) : The Adoration of the Shepherds (YP), The Death of Saint Peter Martyr (YP), The Garden of Love (YP), The Madonna and Child (YP)
Balthasar van der Ast (1593–1656) (YP) : Flowers in a Vase with Shells and Insects (YP)
Hendrick Avercamp (1585–1634) (YP) : A Scene on the Ice near a Town (YP) and A Winter Scene with Skaters near a Castle (YP)

B
Francesco Bacchiacca (1494–1557) (YP) : Joseph pardons his Brothers (YP), Joseph receives his Brothers on their Second Visit to Egypt (YP), Marcus Curtius (YP)
Sisto Badalocchio (1585–after 1621) (YP) : Christ carried to the Tomb (YP)
Ludolf Bakhuizen (1631–1708) (YP) : A Beach Scene with Fishermen (YP), A View across a River near Dordrecht (YP), An English Vessel and a Man-of-war in a Rough Sea off a Coast with Tall Cliffs (YP), Dutch Men-of-war and Small Vessels in a Fresh Breeze off Enkhuizen (YP), Dutch Men-of-war entering a Mediterranean Port (YP), The Eendracht and a Fleet of Dutch Men-of-war (YP)
Alesso Baldovinetti (1425–1499) (YP) : Portrait of a Lady in Yellow (YP)
Hans Baldung (1484–1545) (YP) : Portrait of a Man (YP) and The Trinity and Mystic Pietà (YP)
Hendrick van Balen (1575–1632) (YP) : Pan pursuing Syrinx (YP)
Peder Balke (1804–1887) (YP) : The Tempest (YP)
Jacopo de' Barbari (ca. 1445–1516) (YP) : A Sparrowhawk (YP)
Barnaba da Modena (1361–1383) (YP) : Pentecost (YP) and The Coronation of the Virgin: The Trinity, The Virgin and Child, The Crucifixion (YP)
Federico Barocci (1530–1612) (YP) : Madonna of the Cat ('La Madonna del Gatto') (YP)
Fra Bartolomeo (1472–1517) (YP) : The Madonna and Child with Saint John (YP) and The Virgin adoring the Child with Saint Joseph (YP)
Bartolomeo Veneto (c.1480–c.1546) (YP) : Lodovico Martinengo (YP) and Portrait of a Young Lady (YP)
Antoine-Louis Barye (1796–1875) (YP) : The Forest of Fontainebleau (YP)
Marco Basaiti (1496–1530) (YP) : Portrait of a Young Man (YP) and The Virgin and Child (YP)
Jacopo Bassano (1510–1592) (YP) : The Adoration of the Shepherds (YP), The Departure of Abraham (YP), The Good Samaritan (YP), The Purification of the Temple (YP), The Way to Calvary (YP)
Bartholomeus van Bassen (1590–1652) (YP) : Interior of a Church (YP) and Interior of St Cunerakerk, Rhenen (YP)
Lazzaro Bastiani (before 1430–1512) (YP) : The Virgin and Child (YP)
Pompeo Batoni (1708–1787) (YP) : Portrait of John Scott of Banks Fee (YP), Portrait of Richard Milles (YP), Portrait of Humphry Morice : Time orders Old Age to destroy Beauty (YP)
Lubin Baugin (ca. 1610–1663) (YP) : Holy Family with the Infant Saint John the Baptist, Saint Elizabeth and Three Figures (YP)
Francisco Bayeu y Subías (1734–1795) (YP) : Saint James being visited by the Virgin with a Statue of the Madonna of Pilar (YP)
Giuseppe Bazzani (1690–1769) (YP) : Saint Anthony of Padua with the Infant Christ (YP)
Domenico di Pace Beccafumi (1484–1551) (YP) : Marcia (YP), Tanaquil (YP), The Story of Papirius (YP)
Jan Abrahamsz Beerstraaten (1622–1666) (YP) : The Castle of Muiden in Winter (YP)
Cornelis Pietersz Bega (1620–1664) (YP) : An Astrologer (YP)
Abraham Begeyn (1637–1697) (YP) : Peasants with Cattle by a Ruin (YP)
Gentile Bellini (1435–1516) (YP) : A Man with a Pair of Dividers (YP), Cardinal Bessarion and Two Members of the Scuola della Carità in prayer with the Bessarion Reliquary (YP), Doge Niccolò Marcello (YP), The Sultan Mehmet II (YP), The Virgin and Child Enthroned (YP)
Giovanni Bellini (1435–1516) (YP) : A Dominican, with the Attributes of Saint Peter Martyr (YP), Portrait of Doge Leonardo Loredan (YP), Madonna del Prato (Bellini) (YP), Portrait of Fra Teodoro of Urbino as Saint Dominic (YP), Saint Jerome reading in a Landscape (YP), The Adoration of the Kings (YP)
Antonio de Bellis (c.1616–c.1656) (YP) : The Finding of Moses (YP)
Bernardo Bellotto (1720–1780) (YP) : A Caprice Landscape with Ruins (YP) and Venice: Upper Reaches of the Grand Canal facing Santa Croce (YP)
Ambrosius Benson (1484–1550) (YP) : The Magdalen Reading (YP)
Benvenuto di Giovanni (1436–1518) (YP) : Saint Nicholas (YP), Saint Peter (YP), The Virgin and Child (YP), The Virgin and Child (YP)
Nicolaes Pieterszoon Berchem (1620–1683) (YP) : A Man and a Youth ploughing with Oxen (YP), A Peasant playing a Hurdy-Gurdy to a Woman and Child in a Woody Landscape, with Oxen, Sheep and Goats (YP), A Stag Hunt in a Forest (YP), Mountainous Landscape with Muleteers (YP), Peasants with Cattle fording a Stream (YP), Peasants with Four Oxen and a Goat at a Ford by a Ruined Aqueduct (YP)
Dirck van der Bergen (1645–1689) (YP) : Two Calves, a Sheep and a Dun Horse by a Ruin (YP)
Ambrogio Bergognone (ca. 1453–1523) (YP) : Christ carrying the Cross (YP), Saint Ambrose (YP), Saint Paul (YP), The Agony in the Garden (YP), The Virgin and Child (YP), The Virgin and Child with Saint Catherine of Alexandria and Saint Catherine of Siena (YP)
Bernardino Bergognone (c.1460–1470–1523) (YP) : The Virgin and Child with Two Angels (YP)
Gerrit Adriaenszoon Berckheyde (1638–1698) (YP) : The Interior of the Grote Kerk, Haarlem (YP), The Market Place and the Grote Kerk at Haarlem (YP), The Market Place and Town Hall, Haarlem (YP)
Bartolomé Bermejo (c.1436–1440–c.1498) (YP) : Saint Michael triumphant over the Devil with the Donor Antonio Juan (YP)
Gian Lorenzo Bernini (1598–1680) (YP) : Saints Andrew and Thomas (YP)
Giovanni Battista Bertucci (1500–1530) (YP) : The Incredulity of Saint Thomas (YP) and The Virgin and Child in Glory (YP)
Joachim Beuckelaer (1533–1574) (YP) : The Four Elements: Air (YP), The Four Elements: Earth (YP), The Four Elements: Fire (YP), The Four Elements: Water (YP)
Jan van Bijlert (1597–1671) (YP) : Portrait of an Elderly Man and Woman, and a Younger Woman, outside a House (YP)
Giovanni Biliverti (1576–1644) (YP) : Saint Zenobius revives a Dead Boy (YP)
Francesco Bissolo (c.1470–1554) (YP) : The Virgin and Child with Saint Paul and a Female Martyr (YP) and The Virgin and Child with Saints Michael and Veronica and Two Donors (YP)
Marie Blancour (1650–1699) (YP) : A Bowl of Flowers (YP)
Boccaccio Boccaccino (before 1466–1525) (YP) : Christ carrying the Cross and the Virgin Mary Swooning (YP)
Louis-Léopold Boilly (1761–1845) (YP) : A Girl at a Window (YP)
Ferdinand Bol (1616–1680) (YP) : A Lady with a Fan (YP) and An Astronomer (YP)
Giovanni Antonio Boltraffio (1467–1516) (YP) : A Man in Profile (YP), The Virgin and Child (1) (YP), The Virgin and Child (2) (YP)
Benedetto Bonfigli (c.1420–1496) (YP) : The Adoration of the Kings, and Christ on the Cross (YP)
Rosa Bonheur (1822–1899) (YP) : The Horse Fair (YP)
Bono da Ferrara (1430–1465) (YP) : Saint Jerome in a Landscape (YP)
Francesco Bonsignori (1455–1519) (YP) : Portrait of an Elderly Man (YP) and The Virgin and Child with Four Saints (YP)
François Bonvin (1817–1887) (YP) : Still Life with Book, Papers and Inkwell (YP) and The Meadow (YP)
Gerard ter Borch (1617–1681) (YP) : A Woman playing a Theorbo to Two Men (YP), An Officer dictating a Letter (YP), Portrait of a Young Man (YP), Portrait of Hermanna van der Cruis (YP), The Swearing of the Oath of Ratification of the Treaty of Münster (YP)
Paris Bordone (1500–1571) (YP) : A Pair of Lovers (YP), Christ as 'The Light of the World' (YP), Christ baptising Saint John Martyr (YP), Portrait of a Young Woman (YP), Portrait of a Young Woman (YP)
Anthonie van Borssom (1631–1677) (YP) : A Garden Scene with Waterfowl (YP)
Johannes Bosboom (1817–1891) (YP) : The Interior of the Bakenesserkerk, Haarlem (YP)
Hieronymus Bosch (1450–1516) (YP) : Christ Crowned with Thorns (Bosch, London) (YP)
Pieter van den Bosch (1612–1673) (YP) : A Woman scouring a Pot (YP)
Ambrosius Bosschaert (1573–1621) (YP) : A Still Life of Flowers in a Wan-Li Vase on a Ledge with further Flowers, Shells and a Butterfly (YP) and Flowers in a Glass Vase (YP)
Jan Dirksz Both (1618–1652) (YP) : A Rocky Italian Landscape with Herdsmen and Muleteers (YP), A Rocky Landscape with an Ox-cart (YP), A Rocky Landscape with Peasants and Pack Mules (YP), A View on the Tiber, near the Ripa Grande, Rome (YP), Muleteers, and a Herdsman with an Ox and Goats by a Pool (YP), Peasants with Mules and Oxen on a Track near a River (YP)
Sandro Botticelli (1444–1510) (YP) : A Lady in Profile (YP), Adoration of the Kings (YP), Four Scenes from the Early Life of Saint Zenobius (YP), The Mystical Nativity (YP), Portrait of a Young Man (Botticelli, London) (YP), Saint Francis of Assisi with Angels (YP)
Francesco Botticini (1446–1497) (YP) : Saint Jerome in Penitence with Saints and Donors (YP), Scenes from the Life of Saint Jerome (YP), The Assumption of the Virgin (YP), The Crucifixion (YP)
François Boucher (1703–1770) (YP) : Landscape with a Watermill (YP), Pan and Syrinx (YP), The Billet-Doux (YP)
Eugène Boudin (1824–1898) (YP) : Beach at Trouville (YP), Beach Scene, Trouville (YP), Beach Scene, Trouville (YP), Beach Scene, Trouville (YP), Brussels Harbour (YP), Deauville Harbour (YP)
Louis de Boullogne (1654–1733) (YP) : Nessus and Dejanira (YP)
Sébastien Bourdon (1616–1671) (YP) : The Return of the Ark (YP)
Dieric Bouts (1415–1475) (YP) : Christ Crowned with Thorns (YP), Christ Crowned with Thorns (YP), Mater Dolorosa (YP), Portrait of a Man (Jan van Winckele) (YP), The Entombment (Bouts) (YP), The Virgin and Child (YP)
André Bouys (1656–1740) (YP) : La Barre and Other Musicians (YP)
William Boxall (1800–1879) (YP) : Self Portrait at the Age of about Nineteen (YP)
Bramantino (c.1460–1530) (YP) : The Adoration of the Kings (YP)
Jan de Bray (1627–1697) (YP) : Portrait of a Woman with a Black Cap (YP)
Bartholomeus Breenbergh (1598–1657) (YP) : The Finding of the Infant Moses by Pharaoh's Daughter (YP)
Quirijn van Brekelenkam (1622–1670) (YP) : A Woman Asleep by a Fire (YP), An Interior, with a Man and a Woman seated by a Fire (YP), Interior of a Tailor's Shop (YP)
Andrea del Brescianino (ca. 1485-ca. 1545) (YP) : The Madonna and Child with the Infant Baptist and Saints Paul and Catherine of Siena (YP)
Paul Bril (1554–1626) (YP) : Diana and Callisto (YP)
Bronzino (1503–1572) (YP) : Venus, Cupid, Folly and Time (YP), Portrait of a Lady (YP), Portrait of Cosimo I de' Medici, Grand Duke of Tuscany (YP), Portrait of Piero de' Medici ('The Gouty') (YP), The Madonna and Child with Saint John the Baptist and Saint Elizabeth (YP)
Adriaen Brouwer (1605–1638) (YP) : Four Peasants in a Cellar (YP) and Tavern Scene (YP)
John Lewis Brown (1829–1892) (YP) : The Performing Dog (YP)
Pieter Bruegel the Elder (1526–1569) (YP) : Landscape: A River among Mountains (YP) : The Adoration of the Kings (YP)
Jan Brueghel the Elder (1568–1624) (YP) : The Adoration of the Kings (YP)
Hendrick ter Brugghen (1588–1629) (YP) : A Man playing a Lute (YP), Jacob reproaching Laban for giving him Leah in place of Rachel (YP), The Concert (YP)
Paul Theodor van Brussel (1754–1795) (YP) : Flowers in a Vase (YP), Flowers in a Vase (YP), Fruit and Flowers (YP)
Barthel Bruyn the Elder (1493–1553) (YP) : A Man, probably of the Strauss Family (YP), The Virgin, Saint John, Saint Mary Magdalene and a Holy Woman (YP)
Giovanni Buonconsiglio (c.1465–c.1537) (YP) : Saint John the Baptist (YP)
Andrea Busati (1480–1510) (YP) : The Entombment (YP)
Bernardino Butinone (ca. 1436-ca. 1507) (YP) : The Adoration of the Shepherds (YP)
Willem Pieterszoon Buytewech (1591–1624) (YP) : A Dune Landscape (YP)

C
Alexandre Calame (1810–1864) (YP) : The Lake of Thun (YP)
Abraham van Calraet (1642–1722) (YP) : A Boy holding a Grey Horse (YP), A Brown and White Skewbald Horse with a Saddle beside it (YP), Scene on the Ice outside Dordrecht (YP), The Interior of a Stable (YP)
Pedro de Campaña (1503–1580) (YP) : The Conversion of Mary Magdalene (YP)
Bernardino Campi (1522–1591) (YP) : Portrait of a Musician (YP)
Robert Campin (1375–1444) (YP) : A Man (YP), A Woman (YP), Portrait of a Franciscan (YP), The Virgin and Child before a Firescreen (YP), The Virgin and Child in an Apse with Two Angels (YP), The Virgin and Child in an Interior (YP)
Canaletto (1697–1768) (YP) : A Regatta on the Grand Canal (YP), Eton College (YP), London: Interior of the Rotunda at Ranelagh (YP), Venice: A Regatta on the Grand Canal (YP), The Stonemason's Yard (YP), Venice: Entrance to the Cannaregio (YP)
Bartolomeo Caporali (ca. 1420–1505) (YP) : Saint Bartholomew (YP), Saint John the Baptist (YP), The Virgin and Child with Saints, Angels and a Donor (YP)
Jan van de Cappelle (1626–1679) (YP) : A Coast Scene, with a Small Dutch Vessel landing Passengers (YP), A Dutch Yacht firing a Salute as a Barge pulls away, and Many Small Vessels at Anchor (YP), A River Scene with a Dutch Yacht firing a Salute as Two Barges pull away (YP), A River Scene with a Large Ferry and Numerous Dutch Vessels at Anchor (YP), A River Scene with Dutch Vessels Becalmed (YP), A Small Dutch Vessel before a Light Breeze (YP)
Caravaggio (1571–1610) (YP) : Boy Bitten by a Lizard (Caravaggio) (YP), Salome with the Head of John the Baptist (Caravaggio), London (YP), Supper at Emmaus (Caravaggio), London (YP)
Giovanni Cariani (c.1485–1547) (YP) : Francesco Albani  (YP) and The Virgin and Child with Saints Joseph and Lucy and a Woman and Boy at Prayer (YP)
Angelo Caroselli (1585–1652) (YP) : The Plague at Ashdod  (YP)
Girolamo da Carpi (1501–1557) (YP) : Cardinal Ippolito de' Medici and Monsignor Mario Bracci (YP) and The Adoration of the Kings (YP)
Annibale Carracci (1560–1609) (YP) : Christ appearing to Saint Anthony Abbot during his Temptation (YP), Domine quo vadis? (Annibale Carracci) (YP), Erminia takes Refuge with the Shepherds (YP), Marsyas and Olympus (YP), Putto gathering Grapes (YP), Saint John the Baptist seated in the Wilderness (YP)
Antonio Marziale Carracci (c.1583–1618 ) (YP) : The Martyrdom of Saint Stephen (YP)
Ludovico Carracci (1555–1619) (YP) : Susannah and the Elders (YP) and The Marriage of the Virgin (YP)
Rosalba Carriera (1675–1757) (YP) : Rosalba Carriera (YP)
Vincenzo Catena (c.1470–1531) (YP) : A Warrior adoring the Infant Christ and the Virgin (YP), Portrait of a Young Man (YP), Portrait of the Doge, Andrea Gritti (YP), Saint Jerome in his Study (YP), The Madonna and Child with the Infant Saint John the Baptist (YP)
Bernardo Cavallino (1616–1656) (YP) : Christ driving the Traders from the Temple (YP)
Mirabello Cavalori (1535–1572) (YP) : A Discussion (YP)
Gregorio di Cecco di Luca (c.1390–1428) (YP) : The Marriage of the Virgin (YP)
Jean-Michel Cels (1819–1894) (YP) : Tree study (YP)
Giacomo Ceruti (1698–1767) (YP) : Portrait of a Priest (YP)
Cesare da Sesto (1477–1523) (YP) : Salome (YP)
Paul Cézanne (1839–1906) (YP) : An Old Woman with a Rosary (YP), Avenue at Chantilly (YP), The Bathers (Cézanne) (YP), Hillside in Provence (YP), Landscape with Poplars (YP), Self Portrait (YP)
Philippe de Champaigne (1602–1673) (YP) : Cardinal de Richelieu (YP), The Dream of Saint Joseph (YP), Triple Portrait of Cardinal de Richelieu (YP)
Jean-Baptiste-Siméon Chardin (1699–1779) (YP) : La Fontaine (The Water Cistern) (YP), Still Life with Bottle, Glass and Loaf (YP), The House of Cards (YP), The Young Schoolmistress (YP)
Nicolas Toussaint Charlet (1792–1845) (YP) : Children at a Church Door (YP)
Antoine Chintreuil (1814–1873) (YP) : House on the Cliffs near Fécamp (YP)
Petrus Christus (1415–1476) (YP) : Portrait of a Young Man (YP)
Antonio Cicognara (1480–after 1500) (YP) : Mystic Figure of Christ (YP)
Cimabue (1240–1302) (YP) : The Virgin and Child Enthroned with Two Angels (YP)
Giacomo Francesco Cipper (1664–1736) (YP) : Head of a Man in Blue (YP) and Head of a Man in Red (YP)
Pieter Claesz (1597–1660) (YP) : Still Life with Drinking Vessels (YP)
Paul Jean Clays (1819–1900) (YP) : Ships lying near Dordrecht (YP) and Ships lying off Flushing (YP)
Joos van Cleve (1485–1541) (YP)  : The Adoration of the Kings (YP) and The Holy Family (YP)
Pieter Codde (1599–1678) (YP) : A Woman holding a Mirror (YP) and Portrait of a Man, a Woman and a Boy in a Room (YP)
Cima da Conegliano (ca. 1459–1517/18) (YP) : Christ Crowned with Thorns (YP), David and Jonathan (YP), Saint Jerome in a Landscape (YP), Saint Mark (YP), Saint Sebastian (YP), The Incredulity of Saint Thomas (YP)
Pieter van Coninxloo (1460–1513) (YP) : Margaret of Austria (YP) and Philip the Handsome (YP)
John Constable (1776–1837) (YP) : Cenotaph to the Memory of Sir Joshua Reynolds, erected in the grounds of Coleorton Hall, Leicestershire by the late Sir George Beaumont, Bt. (YP), Salisbury Cathedral and Leadenhall from the River Avon (YP), Stratford Mill (YP), The Cornfield (YP), The Hay Wain (YP), Weymouth Bay: Bowleaze Cove and Jordon Hill (YP)
Gonzales Coques (1614–1683) (YP) : A Family Group (YP), Hearing (YP), Portrait of a Man , Portrait of a Woman (YP), Portrait of a Woman as Saint Agnes (YP), Sight (Portrait of Robert van den Hoecke) (YP)
Cornelis van Haarlem (1562–1637) (YP) : The Preaching of Saint John the Baptist (YP) and Two Followers of Cadmus devoured by a Dragon (YP)
Jean-Baptiste-Camille Corot (1796–1875) (YP) : A Flood (YP), A Peasant Woman (YP), A Wagon in the Plains of Artois (YP), Avignon from the West (YP), Cows in a Marshy Landscape (YP), Dardagny, Morning (YP)
Antonio da Correggio (1489–1534) (YP) : Christ presented to the People (Ecce Homo) (YP), Christ presented to the People (Ecce Homo) (YP), Christ taking Leave of his Mother (YP), Group of Heads (YP), Group of Heads (YP), Head of an Angel (YP)
Pietro da Cortona (1596–1669) (YP) : Saint Cecilia (YP)
Francesco del Cossa (ca. 1435–ca. 1477) (YP) : Saint Vincent Ferrer (YP) and Scenes from the Life of Saint Vincent Ferrer (YP)
Lorenzo Costa (1460–1535) (YP) : A Concert (YP), Portrait of Battista Fiera (YP), Saint John the Baptist (YP), Saint John the Evangelist (YP), Saint Peter (YP), Saint Philip (YP)
Gustave Courbet (1819–1877) (YP) : Beach Scene (YP), In the Forest (YP), Landscape (YP), Self Portrait (YP), Still Life with Apples and a Pomegranate (YP), The Diligence in the Snow (YP)
Thomas Couture (1815–1879) (YP) : Caught by the Tide (YP)
Michiel Coxie (1499–1592) (YP)  : A Man with a Skull (YP)
Lucas Cranach the Elder (1472–1553) (YP) : Charity (YP), Cupid complaining to Venus (YP), Portrait of a Man, probably Johann Feige (YP), Portrait of a Woman (YP), Portrait of Johann Friedrich the Magnanimous (YP), Portrait of Johann the Steadfast (YP)
Giuseppe Crespi (1665–1747) (YP) : Saint Jerome in the Desert (YP)
Carlo Crivelli (1430/35–1495) (YP) : La Madonna della Rondine (The Madonna of the Swallow) (YP), Predella of La Madonna della Rondine (The Madonna of the Swallow) (YP), Saint Andrew (YP), Saint Catherine of Alexandria (YP), Saint Catherine of Alexandria (YP), Saint Dominic (YP)
Aelbert Cuyp (1620–1691) (YP) : A Distant View of Dordrecht, with a Milkmaid and Four Cows, and Other Figures ('The Large Dort') (YP), A Distant View of Dordrecht, with a Sleeping Herdsman and Five Cows ('The Small Dort') (YP), A Herdsman with Five Cows by a River (YP), A Herdsman with Seven Cows by a River (YP), A Hilly River Landscape with a Horseman talking to a Shepherdess (YP), A Horseman with a Cowherd and Two Boys in a Meadow, and Seven Cows (YP)

D
Bernardo Daddi (ca. 1280–1348) (YP) : The Coronation of the Virgin (YP)
Henri-Pierre Danloux (1753–1809) (YP) : The Baron de Besenval in his Salon de Compagnie (YP)
Charles-François Daubigny (1817–1878 ) (YP) : Alders (YP), Honoré Daumier (YP), Landscape with Cattle by a Stream (YP), River Scene with Ducks (YP), St Paul's from the Surrey Side (YP), The Garden Wall (YP)
Honoré Daumier (1808–1879) (YP) : Don Quixote and Sancho Panza (YP)
Gerard David (1460–1523) (YP) : Adoration of the Kings (YP), An Augustinian Friar Praying (YP), Canon Bernardijn Salviati and Three Saints (YP), Christ Nailed to the Cross (YP), Lamentation (YP), Saint Jerome in a Landscape (YP)
Jacques-Louis David (1748–1825) (YP) : Portrait of Jacobus Blauw (YP) and Portrait of the Comtesse Vilain XIIII and her Daughter (YP)
Cornelis Gerritsz Decker (1618–1678) (YP) : A Cottage among Trees on the Bank of a Stream (YP)
Edgar Degas (1834–1917) (YP) : At the Café Châteaudun (YP), Ballet Dancers (YP), Beach Scene (YP), Combing the Hair ('La Coiffure') (YP), Hélène Rouart in her Father's Study (YP), Miss La La at the Cirque Fernando (YP), Young Spartans Exercising
Eugène Delacroix (1798–1863) (YP) : Abel Widmer (YP), Christ on the Cross (YP), Louis-Auguste Schwiter (YP), Ovid among the Scythians (YP)
Paul Delaroche (1797–1856 ) (YP) : The Execution of Lady Jane Grey (YP)
Dirk van Delen (1605–1671) (YP) : An Architectural Fantasy (YP)
Simon Denis (1755–1813) (YP) : Sunset in the Roman Campagna (YP)
Olivier van Deuren (1666–1714) (YP) : A Young Astronomer (YP)
Benedetto Diana (ca. 1460–1525) (YP) : Salvator Mundi (YP)
Narcisse Virgilio Díaz (1807–1876 ) (YP) : Common with Stormy Sunset (YP), Cows at a Pool (YP), Sunny Days in the Forest (YP), The Storm (YP), Venus and Two Cupids (YP)
Abraham Diepraam (1622–1670) (YP) : A Peasant seated smoking (YP)
Christian Wilhelm Ernst Dietrich (1712–1774) (YP) : The Wandering Musicians (YP)
Anthony van Dyck (1599–1641) (YP) : Carlo and Ubaldo see Rinaldo conquered by Love for Armida (YP), Charity (YP), Drunken Silenus supported by Satyrs (YP), Equestrian Portrait of Charles I (YP), Lady Elizabeth Thimbelby and Dorothy, Viscountess Andover (YP), Lord John Stuart and his Brother, Lord Bernard Stuart (YP)
Carlo Dolci (1616–1686) (YP) : The Adoration of the Kings (YP) and The Virgin and Child with Flowers (YP)
Domenichino (1581–1641) (YP) : Apollo and Neptune advising Laomedon on the Building of Troy (YP), Apollo killing the Cyclops (YP), Apollo pursuing Daphne (YP), Apollo slaying Coronis (YP), Landscape with Tobias laying hold of the Fish (YP), Mercury stealing the Herds of Admetus guarded by Apollo (YP)
Domenico Veneziano (ca. 1410–1461) (YP) : Head of a Tonsured, Bearded Saint (YP), Head of a Tonsured, Beardless Saint (YP), The Virgin and Child Enthroned (YP)
Gerard Donck (1600–1650) (YP) : A Family Group (Jan van Hensbeeck and his Wife, Maria Koeck, and a Child ?) (YP)
Dosso Dossi (1469–1542) (YP) : A Bacchanal (YP), A Female Saint (YP), A Man embracing a Woman (YP), Lamentation over the Body of Christ (YP), The Adoration of the Kings (YP)
Gerrit Dou (1613–1675) (YP) : A Poulterer's Shop (YP), Portrait of a Man (YP), Portrait of a Young Woman (YP)
Willem van Drielenburg (1632–1677) (YP) : A Landscape with a View of Dordrecht (YP)
Willem Drost (1633–1659) (YP) : Portrait of a Young Woman with her Hands Folded on a Book (YP)
François-Hubert Drouais (1727–1775) (YP) : Le Comte de Vaudreuil (YP) and Madame de Pompadour at her Tambour Frame (YP)
Hendrick Dubbels (1621–1707) (YP) : A Dutch Yacht and Other Vessels Becalmed near the Shore (YP)
Claude-Marie Dubufe (1790–1864) (YP) : The Surprise (YP)
Duccio (1255–1319) (YP) : Jesus opens the Eyes of a Man born Blind (YP), The Annunciation (YP), The Transfiguration (YP), The Virgin and Child with Four Angels (YP), The Virgin and Child with Saints Dominic and Aurea (YP)
Joseph Ducreux (1735–1802) (YP) : Portrait of a Man (YP)
Gaspard Dughet (1615–1675) (YP) : Imaginary Landscape with Buildings in Tivoli (YP), Landscape with a Cowherd (YP), Landscape with a Shepherd and his Flock (YP), Landscape with a Storm (YP), Landscape with Abraham and Isaac approaching the Place of Sacrifice (YP), Landscape with Elijah and the Angel (YP)
Willem Cornelisz Duyster (1599–1635) (YP) : Soldiers fighting over Booty in a Barn (YP) and Two Men playing Tric-trac, with a Woman scoring (YP)
Karel Dujardin (1626–1678) (YP) : A Woman and a Boy with Animals at a Ford (YP), A Woman with Cattle and Sheep in an Italian Landscape (YP), Farm Animals in the Shade of a Tree, with a Boy and a Sleeping Herdswoman (YP), Portrait of a Young Man (YP), Sheep and Goats (YP), The Conversion of Saint Paul (YP)
Jules Dupré (1811–1889 ) (YP) : Willows, with a Man Fishing (YP)
Albrecht Dürer (1471–1528) (YP) : St. Jerome in the Wilderness (Dürer) (YP), The Painter's Father (YP), The Virgin and Child ('The Madonna with the Iris') (YP)
Josephus Laurentius Dyckmans (1811–1888) (YP) : The Blind Beggar (YP)

E
Christoffer Wilhelm Eckersberg (1783–1853) (YP) : View of the Forum in Rome (YP)
Gerbrand van den Eeckhout (1621–1674) (YP) : Four Officers of the Amsterdam Coopers' and Wine-rackers' Guild (YP) and Rebekah and Eliezer at the Well (YP)
Adam Elsheimer (1578–1610) (YP) : Saint Lawrence prepared for Martyrdom (YP), Saint Paul on Malta (YP), The Baptism of Christ (YP), Tobias and the Archangel Raphael returning with the Fish (YP)
Caesar van Everdingen (1617–1678) (YP) : Portrait of a Dutch Commander (YP)
Allaert van Everdingen (1621–1675) (YP) : A Saw-mill by a Torrent (YP)
Jan van Eyck (1370–1441) (YP) : A Young Man holding a Ring (YP), Marco Barbarigo (YP), Portrait of a Man ('Léal Souvenir') (YP), Portrait of a Man (Self Portrait?) (YP), Arnolfini Portrait (YP)

F
François-Xavier Fabre (1766–1837 ) (YP) : Italian Landscape (YP)
Carel Fabritius (1622–1654) (YP) : A View of Delft, with a Musical Instrument Seller's Stall (YP) and A Young Man in a Fur Cap and a Cuirass (probably a Self Portrait) (YP)
Barent Fabritius (1624–1673) (YP) : The Adoration of the Shepherds (YP) and The Naming of Saint John the Baptist (YP)
Henri Fantin-Latour (1836–1904) (YP) : A Basket of Roses (YP), Still Life with Glass Jug, Fruit and Flowers (YP), The Rosy Wealth of June (YP)
Paulus Constantijn la Fargue (1728–1782) (YP) : The Grote Markt at The Hague (YP)
Gaudenzio Ferrari (ca. 1475–1546) (YP) : Christ rising from the Tomb (YP), Saint Andrew  (YP), The Annunciation: the angel Gabriel (YP), The Annunciation: the Virgin Mary (YP)
Juan de Flandes (1465–1519) (YP) : Christ appearing to the Virgin with the Redeemed of the Old Testament (YP)
Govert Flinck (1615–1660) (YP) : Self Portrait aged 24 (YP)
Vincenzo Foppa (1427/30–1515/16) (YP) : The Adoration of the Kings (YP)
Gherardo di Giovanni del Fora (1460–1497) (YP) : The Combat of Love and Chastity (YP)
Jean-Louis Forain (1852–1931) (YP) : Legal Assistance (YP)
Mariano José María Bernardo Fortuny y Marsal (1838–1874) (YP) : The Bull-Fighter's Salute (YP)
Jean-Honoré Fragonard (1732–1806) (YP) : Interior Scene (YP) and Psyche showing her Sisters her Gifts from Cupid (YP)
Francesco di Antonio di Bartolomeo (ca. 1393–after 1433) (YP) : The Virgin and Child with Six Angels and Two Cherubim (YP)
Francesco Francia (1447–1517) (YP) : Bartolomeo Bianchini (YP), Mourning over the Dead Christ (YP), Pietà (YP), The Virgin and Child with an Angel (YP), The Virgin and Child with Saint Anne and Other Saints (YP), The Virgin and Child with Two Saints (YP)
Franciabigio (1482–1525) (YP) : Portrait of a Knight of Rhodes (YP)
Peter Franchoys (1606–1654) (YP) : Portrait of Lucas Fayd'herbe (YP)
Caspar David Friedrich (1774–1840) (YP) : Winter Landscape (YP)
Eugène Fromentin (1820–1876) (YP) : The Banks of the Nile (YP)
Bernardino Fungai (1460–1516) (YP) : The Virgin and Child with Cherubim (YP)
Francesco Furini (1600–1646) (YP) : The Three Graces (YP)
Jan Fyt (1611–1661) (YP) : A Still Life with Fruit, Dead Game and a Parrot (YP) and Dead Birds in a Landscape (YP)

G
Agnolo Gaddi (1345–1396) (YP) : The Coronation of the Virgin (YP)
Eduard Gaertner (1801–1877) (YP) : The Friedrichsgracht, Berlin (YP)
Thomas Gainsborough (1727–1788) (YP) : Cornard Wood, near Sudbury, Suffolk (YP), Dr Ralph Schomberg (YP), John Plampin (YP), Mr and Mrs Andrews (YP), Mr and Mrs William Hallett ('The Morning Walk') (YP), Mrs Siddons (YP)
Akseli Gallen-Kallela (1865–1931) (YP) : Lake Keitele (YP)
Garofalo (c.1481–1559) (YP) : A Pagan Sacrifice (YP), An Allegory of Love (YP), Saint Augustine with the Holy Family and Saint Catherine of Alexandria ('The Vision of Saint Augustine') (YP), Saint Catherine of Alexandria (YP), The Agony in the Garden (YP), The Holy Family with Saints John the Baptist, Elizabeth, Zacharias and Francis (YP)
Paul Gauguin (1848–1903) (YP) : A Vase of Flowers (YP) and Bowl of Fruit and Tankard before a Window (YP)
Giovanni Battista Gaulli (1639–1709) (YP) : Portrait of Cardinal Marco Gallo (YP)
Geertgen tot Sint Jans (1460–1495) (YP) : Nativity at Night (Geertgen tot Sint Jans) (YP)
Girolamo Genga (1476–1551) (YP) : A Jesse-Tree (YP)
Justus van Gent (1430–1490) (YP) : Music (YP) and Rhetoric (YP)
Théodore Géricault (1791–1824) (YP) : A Horse frightened by Lightning (YP)
Niccolò di Pietro Gerini (active 1366–ca. 1415) (YP) : Frame Roundel (YP), Saint Paul: Right main tier panel (YP), Saint Peter: Left main tier panel (YP), Scenes from the Life of Saint John the Baptist (YP), The Baptism of Christ: main tier central panel (YP)
Jean-Léon Gérôme (1824–1904) (YP) : Portrait of Armand Gérôme (YP)
Jacob de Gheyn III (1596–1641) (YP) : Saint Paul seated reading (YP)
Davide Ghirlandaio (1452–1525) (YP) : The Virgin and Child with Saint John (YP)
Domenico Ghirlandaio (1449–1494) (YP) : A Legend of Saints Justus and Clement of Volterra (YP), Costanza Caetani (YP), Portrait of a Girl (YP), Portrait of a Young Man in Red (YP), The Virgin and Child (YP)
Ridolfo Ghirlandaio (1483–1561) (YP) : Portrait of Girolamo Benivieni (YP) and The Procession to Calvary (YP)
Michele Giambono (ca. 1400–ca. 1462) (YP) : A Saint with a Book (YP)
Giampietrino (1520–1540) (YP) : Christ carrying his Cross (YP) and Salome (YP)
Giannicola di Paolo (c.1460–1544) (YP) : The Annunciation (YP)
Corrado Giaquinto (1703–1766) (YP) : Apotheosis of the Spanish Monarchy (YP), Moses striking the Rock (YP), The Brazen Serpent (YP)
Luca Giordano (1632–1705) (YP) : A Homage to Velázquez (YP), Perseus turning Phineas and his Followers to Stone (YP), Saint Anthony of Padua miraculously restores the Foot of a Self-Mutilated Man (YP), The Martyrdom of Saint Januarius (YP), The Toilet of Bathsheba (YP)
Francesco di Giorgio (1439–1502) (YP) : Saint Dorothy and the Infant Christ (YP)
Giorgione (1477–1510) (YP) : A Man in Armour (YP), Homage to a Poet (YP), Il Tramonto (The Sunset) (YP), Nymphs and Children in a Landscape with Shepherds (YP), The Adoration of the Kings (YP)
Giotto (1266–1337) (YP) : Pentecost (YP) and The Dead Christ and the Virgin (YP)
Giovanni da Milano (active 1350-69–after 1369) (YP) : Christ and the Virgin with Saints (YP), Christ of the Apocalypse: central pinnacle panel (YP), Saint John the Baptist: right pinnacle panel (YP), The Virgin: Left pinnacle panel (YP)
Giovanni dal Ponte (1385-ca. 1438) (YP) : An Unknown Saint, Saint Cosmas and Saint Francis (YP), Saint Gabriel: left pinnacle panel (YP), Saint Michael: Roundel above-left panel (YP), Saints Bernard, Scholastica, Benedict and John the Baptist (YP), Saints Nicholas, Damian and Margaret: right pilaster (YP), Saints Peter, Romuald, Catherine of Alexandria and Jerome (YP)
Giovanni da Udine (1487–1564) (YP) : The Virgin and Child with Saints George, James the Greater and a Donor (YP)
Giovanni di Nicola (active 1326–1358) (YP) : Saint Anthony Abbot (YP)
Giovanni di Paolo (1403–1482) (YP) : Saint John the Baptist retiring to the Desert: predella (YP), Saints Fabian and Sebastian (YP), The Baptism of Christ: predella panel (YP), The Birth of Saint John the Baptist: predella panel (YP), The Head of John the Baptist brought to Herod: predella (YP)
Giovanni Francesco da Rimini (c.1420–1470) (YP) : The Virgin and Child with Two Angels (YP)
Giulio Romano (1499–1546) (YP) : Saint Mary Magdalene borne by Angels (YP), The Attack on Cartagena (YP), The Continence of Scipio (YP), The Infant Jupiter guarded by the Corybantes on the Island of Crete (YP), The Intervention of the Sabine Women (YP), The Rape of the Sabines (YP)
Gerolamo Giovenone (1486/1487–1555) (YP) : The Virgin and Child with Saints and Donors (YP)
Girolamo da Treviso (ca. 1497–1544) (YP) : The Adoration of the Kings (YP) and The Madonna and Child with Angels, Saints and a Donor (YP)
Hugo van der Goes (1440–1482) (YP) : The Death of the Virgin (YP), The Nativity, at Night (YP), Virgin and Child (after van der Goes?) (YP)
Jan Mabuse (1478–1532) (YP) : A Man holding a Glove (YP), A Young Princess (Dorothea of Denmark) (YP), An Elderly Couple (YP), Man with a Rosary (YP), The Adoration of the Kings (Gossaert) (YP), The Magdalen (YP)
Francisco Goya (1746–1828) (YP) : A Picnic (YP), A Scene from El Hechizado por Fuerza ('The Forcibly Bewitched') (YP), Portrait of Doña Isabel de Porcel (YP), Don Andrés del Peral (YP), Portrait of the Duke of Wellington (Goya) (YP)
Jan van Goyen (1596–1656) (YP) : A Cottage on a Heath (YP), A River Landscape (YP), A River Scene, with a Hut on an Island (YP), A River Scene, with Fishermen laying a Net (YP), A Scene on the Ice by a Drinking Booth: A Village in the Distance (YP), A Scene on the Ice near Dordrecht (YP)
Benozzo Gozzoli (1420–1497) (YP) : The Virgin and Child Enthroned among Angels and Saints (YP), The Virgin and Child Enthroned with Angels (YP), The Virgin and Child with Angels (YP)
Francesco Granacci (1469–1543) (YP) : Portrait of a Man in Armour (YP)
El Greco (1541–1614) (YP) : Christ Driving the Money Changers from the Temple (El Greco, London) (YP), Saint Jerome as Cardinal (YP), Saint Peter (YP), The Adoration of the Name of Jesus (YP), The Agony in the Garden of Gethsemane (YP)
Jean-Baptiste Greuze (1725–1805) (YP) : A Child with an Apple (YP), A Girl (YP), A Girl (YP), A Girl with a Lamb (YP), Portrait of a Man (YP)
Francesco Guardi (1712–1793) (YP) : A Caprice with a Ruined Arch (YP), A Caprice with Ruins on the Seashore (YP), A Gondola on the Lagoon near Mestre (YP), A Ruin Caprice (YP), A Ruin Caprice (YP), A View near Venice (YP)
Guercino (1591–1666) (YP) : A Bearded Man holding a Lamp (YP), Elijah fed by Ravens (YP), The Dead Christ mourned by Two Angels (YP), The Incredulity of Saint Thomas (YP)

H
Joris van der Haagen (1615–1669) (YP) : A River Landscape (YP)
Jan Cornelis Haccou (1798–1839) (YP) : A Road by a Cottage (YP)
Frans Hals (1582–1666) (YP) : A Family Group in a Landscape (YP), Portrait of a Man holding Gloves (YP), Portrait of a Man in his Thirties (YP), Portrait of a Middle-Aged Woman with Hands Folded (YP), Portrait of a Woman (Marie Larp) (YP), Portrait of a Woman with a Fan (YP)
Dirck Hals (1591–1656) (YP) : A Party at Table (YP)
Willem van Herp (1613–1677) (YP) : Saint Anthony of Padua distributing Bread (YP)
Henri Harpignies (1819–1916) (YP) : A River Scene (YP), Autumn Evening (YP), Olive Trees at Menton (YP), River and Hills (YP), The Painter's Garden at Saint-Privé (YP)
Willem Claeszoon Heda (1594–1680) (YP) : Still Life: Pewter and Silver vessels and a Crab (YP) and Still Life with a Lobster (YP)
Gerret Willemsz Heda (1622–1649) (YP) : Still Life with a Nautilus Cup (YP)
Jan Davidsz. de Heem (1606–1683) (YP) : Still Life (YP)
Maarten van Heemskerck (1498–1574) (YP) : The Donor and Saint Mary Magdalene (YP) and The Virgin and Saint John the Evangelist (YP)
Wolfgang Heimbach (c.1610–after 1678) (YP) : Portrait of a Young Man (YP)
Bartholomeus van der Helst (1613–1670) (YP) : Portrait of a Girl in Pale Blue with an Ostrich Feather Fan (YP), Portrait of a Lady in Black Satin with a Fan (YP), Portrait of a Man in Black holding a Glove (YP)
Caterina van Hemessen (1528–1587) (YP) : A Lady with a Rosary (YP), Portrait of a Lady (YP), Portrait of a Man (YP)
Wybrand Hendricks (1744–1831) (YP) : Fruit, Flowers and Dead Birds (YP)
Jean Hey (1471–1500) (YP) : Charlemagne, and the Meeting of Saints Joachim and Anne at the Golden Gate (YP)
Jan van der Heyden (1637–1712) (YP) : A Farm among Trees (YP), A Square before a Church (YP), A View in Cologne (YP), An Architectural Fantasy (YP), An Imaginary View of Nijenrode Castle and the Sacristy of Utrecht Cathedral (YP), The Huis ten Bosch at The Hague (YP)
Meindert Hobbema (1638–1709) (YP) : A Road winding past Cottages (YP), A Stream by a Wood (YP), A Woody Landscape (YP), A Woody Landscape with a Cottage (YP), Cottages in a Wood (YP), The Avenue at Middelharnis (YP)
William Hogarth (1697–1764) (YP) : Marriage à-la-mode (Hogarth) (YP), Marriage A-la-Mode: 2, The Tête à Tête (YP), Marriage A-la-Mode: 3, The Inspection (YP), Marriage A-la-Mode: 4, The Toilette (YP), Marriage A-la-Mode: 5, The Bagnio (YP), Marriage A-la-Mode: 6, The Lady's Death (YP)
Hans Holbein the Younger (1497–1543) (YP) : A Lady with a Squirrel and a Starling (Anne Lovell) (YP), Christina of Denmark, Duchess of Milan (YP), The Ambassadors (YP)
Melchior d'Hondecoeter (1636–1695) (YP) : A Cock, Hens and Chicks (YP), Birds, Butterflies and a Frog among Plants and Fungi (YP)
Gerard van Honthorst (1592–1656) (YP) : Christ before the High Priest (YP), Elizabeth Stuart, Queen of Bohemia (YP), Saint Sebastian (YP)
Pieter de Hooch (1629–1683) (YP) : A Man with Dead Birds, and Other Figures, in a Stable (YP), A Musical Party in a Courtyard (YP), A Woman and her Maid in a Courtyard (YP), An Interior, with a Woman Drinking with Two Men and a Maidservant (YP), The Courtyard of a House in Delft (YP)
Samuel Dirksz van Hoogstraten (1627–1678) (YP) : A Peepshow with Views of the Interior of a Dutch House (YP)
John Hoppner (1758–1810) (YP) : Sir George Beaumont (YP)
John Callcott Horsley (1817–1903) (YP) : Portrait of Martin Colnaghi (YP)
Wolf Huber (1490–1553) (YP) : Christ taking leave of his Mother (YP)
Jan van Huchtenburg (1647–1733) (YP) : A Battle (YP)
Paul Huet (1803–1869) (YP) : Trees in the Park at Saint-Cloud (YP)
Jan Baptist Huysmans (1654–1716) (YP) : A Cowherd in a Woody Landscape (YP)
Jan van Huysum (1682–1749) (YP) : Flowers in a Stone Vase (YP), Flowers in a Terracotta Vase (YP), Hollyhocks and Other Flowers in a Vase (YP)

I
Jean Auguste Dominique Ingres (1780–1867) (YP) : Angelica saved by Ruggiero (YP), Madame Moitessier (YP), Monsieur de Norvins (YP), Oedipus and the Sphinx (YP), Pindar and Ictinus (YP), The Duc d'Orléans (YP)
George Inness (1825–1894) (YP) : The Delaware Water Gap (YP)
Eugène Isabey (1803–1886) (YP) : Grandfather's Birthday (YP) and The Fish Market, Dieppe (YP)
Adriaen Isenbrandt (1485–1551) (YP) : The Entombment (YP) and The Magdalen in a Landscape (YP)
Jozef Israëls (1824–1911) (YP) : An Old Man writing by Candlelight (YP) and Fishermen carrying a Drowned Man (YP)

J
John Jackson (1778–1831) (YP) : Reverend William Holwell Carr (YP) and William Seguier (YP)
Jacobello di Bonomo (active 1378–1385) (YP) : The Man of Sorrows (YP) (attributed)
Jacometto Veneziano (active 1472–1497) (YP) : Portrait of a Boy (YP) and Portrait of a Man (YP)
Jacopo di Antonio (1427–1454) (YP) : A Bishop (Donatus) and a Female Martyr (Antilla) (YP), Gabriel: Frame roundel left (YP), Left pilaster of an altarpiece (YP), Right pilaster of an altarpiece (YP), Saint John the Evangelist: altarpiece pinnacle right (YP), Saints Michael and John the Baptist: main tier left panel (YP)
Jacopo di Cione (ca. 1325–ca. 1399) (YP) : Adoring Saints: Left main tier panel (YP), Adoring Saints: Right main tier panel (YP), Pentecost (YP), Seraphim, Cherubim and Adoring Angels: left pinnacle panel (YP), Seraphim, Cherubim and Adoring Angels: right pinnacle panel (YP), The Adoration of the Kings (YP)
Hieronymus Janssens (1624–1693) (YP) : Ladies and Gentlemen playing La Main Chaude (YP)
Cornelis Janssens van Ceulen (1593–1661) (YP) : Portrait of a Lady (YP)
Thomas Jones (1742–1803) (YP) : A Wall in Naples (YP)
Johan Jongkind (1819–1891) (YP) : River Scene (YP), Skating in Holland (YP), The Boulevard de Port-Royal, Paris (YP)
Jacob Jordaens (1593–1678) (YP) : Portrait of Govaert van Surpele and his Wife (YP), The Holy Family and Saint John the Baptist (YP), The Virgin and Child with Saints Zacharias, Elizabeth and John the Baptist (YP)
Jens Juel (1745–1802) (YP) : Joseph Greenway (YP)

K
Willem Kalf (1619–1693) (YP) : Still Life with the Drinking-Horn of the Saint Sebastian Archers' Guild, Lobster and Glasses (YP)
Thomas de Keyser (1596–1667) (YP) : Portrait of Constantijn Huygens and his Clerk (YP)
Gustav Klimt (1862–1918) (YP) : Portrait of Hermine Gallia (YP)
Christen Købke (1810–1848) (YP) : Portrait of Wilhelm Bendz (YP) and The Northern Drawbridge to the Citadel in Copenhagen (YP)
Willem Koekkoek (1839–1895) (YP) : View of Oudewater (YP)
Philip de Koninck (1619–1688) (YP) : An Extensive Landscape with a hawking party (YP), An Extensive Landscape with a road by a river (YP), An Extensive Landscape with a town in the middle distance (YP), An Extensive Landscape with houses in a wood and a distant town (YP)
David de Coninck (1642–1701) (YP) : Dead Birds and Game with Gun Dogs and a Little Owl (YP)

L
Jan de Lagoor (1620–1660) (YP) : A Woody Landscape with a Stag Hunt (YP)
Laurent de La Hyre (1605–1656) (YP) : Allegory of Grammar (YP)
Nicolas Lancret (1690–1743) (YP) : A Lady in a Garden taking Coffee with some Children (YP), The Four Ages of Man: Childhood (YP), The Four Ages of Man: Maturity (YP), The Four Ages of Man: Old Age (YP), The Four Ages of Man: Youth (YP), The Four Times of Day: Afternoon (YP)
Bernardino Lanini (c.1509–after 1581) (YP) : The Madonna and Child with Saint Mary Magdalene, Saint Gregory, Saint Joseph and Saint Paul (YP)
Nicolas de Largillière (1656–1746) (YP) : Portrait of a Man (YP) and Princess Rákóczi (YP)
Pieter Lastman (1583–1633) (YP) : Juno discovering Jupiter with Io (YP)
Lieven van Lathem (1430–1493) (YP) : The Virgin and Child with Saints and Donor (YP)
Thomas Lawrence (1769–1830) (YP) : John Julius Angerstein, aged about 55 (YP), John Julius Angerstein, aged over 80 (YP), Queen Charlotte (YP)
Gregorio Lazzarini (1655–1730) (YP) : Portrait of Antonio Correr (YP)
Le Nain (1588–1648) (YP) : Three Men and a Boy (YP), A Woman and Five Children (YP), Four Figures at a Table (YP), Adoration of the Shepherds (Le Nain) (YP)
Jean-Baptiste Le Prince (1734–1781) (YP) : The Necromancer (YP)
Juan de Valdés Leal (1622–1690) (YP) : The Immaculate Conception of the Virgin, with Two Donors (YP)
Leandro Bassano (1557–1622) (YP) : Portrait of a Bearded Man (YP) and The Tower of Babel (YP)
Eustache Le Sueur (1616–1655) (YP) : Alexander and his Doctor (YP), Christ on the Cross with the Magdalen, the Virgin Mary and Saint John the Evangelist (YP), Saint Paul preaching at Ephesus (YP)
Ignacio de Léon y Escosura (1834–1901) (YP) : A Man in 17th-Century Spanish Costume (YP)
Leonardo da Vinci (1452–1519) (YP) : An Angel in Green with a Vielle (YP), An Angel in Red with a Lute (YP), Narcissus (YP), The Virgin and Child with St Anne and St John the Baptist (YP), Virgin of the Rocks (YP)
Stanislas Lépine (1835–1892) (YP) : A Gateway behind Trees (YP), Nuns and Schoolgirls in the Tuileries Gardens, Paris (YP), The Pont de la Tournelle, Paris (YP)
Lucas van Leyden (1494–1533) (YP) : A Man aged 38 (YP) and Lot's Daughters make their Father drink Wine (YP)
Judith Leyster (1609–1660) (YP) : A Boy and a Girl with a Cat and an Eel (YP)
Liberale da Verona (c.1445–c.1526) (YP) : Dido's Suicide (YP) and The Virgin and Child with Two Angels (YP)
Girolamo dai Libri (c.1474–1555) (YP) : The Virgin and Child with Saint Anne (YP)
Bernardino Licinio (ca. 1489–ca. 1565) (YP) : Portrait of Stefano Nani (YP) and The Madonna and Child with Saint Joseph and a Female Martyr (YP)
Jan Lievens (1607–1674) (YP) : A Landscape with Tobias and the Angel (YP), Portrait of Anna Maria van Schurman (YP), Self Portrait (YP)
Johannes Lingelbach (1622–1674) (YP) : Peasants loading a Hay Cart (YP)
John Linnell (1792–1882) (YP) : Samuel Rogers (YP)
Hendrik Frans van Lint (1684–1763) (YP) : A Landscape with an Italian Hill Town (YP)
Filippo Lippi (1406–1469) (YP) : Angel (Left Hand) (YP), Angel (Right Hand) (YP), Beheading of Saint James the Greater: predella panel (YP), Saint Bernard's Vision of the Virgin (YP), Saint Jerome and the Lion: predella panel (YP), Saint Mamas in Prison thrown to the Lions: predella panel (YP)
Filippino Lippi (1457–1504) (YP) : An Angel Adoring (YP), Moses brings forth Water out of the Rock (YP), The Adoration of the Kings (YP), The Virgin and Child with Saint John (YP), The Virgin and Child with Saints Jerome and Dominic (YP), The Worship of the Egyptian Bull God, Apis (YP)
Lippo di Dalmasio (c.1353–c.1410) (YP) : The Madonna of Humility (YP)
Johann Liss (1590–1629) (YP) : Judith in the Tent of Holofernes (YP)
Stefan Lochner (ca. 1400–1451) (YP) : Saints Matthew, Catherine of Alexandria and John the Evangelist (YP)
Alessandro Longhi (1733–1813) (YP) : Caterina Penza (YP)
Pietro Longhi (1702–1783) (YP) : A Fortune Teller at Venice (YP), A Lady receiving a Cavalier (YP), A Nobleman kissing a Lady's Hand (YP), An Interior with Three Women and a Seated Man (YP), Exhibition of a Rhinoceros at Venice (YP)
Ambrogio Lorenzetti (1290–1348) (YP) : A Group of Poor Clares (YP)
Pietro Lorenzetti (1280–1348) (YP) : A Crowned Female Figure (Saint Elizabeth of Hungary?) (YP), A Female Saint in Yellow (YP), Saint Sabinus before the Governor of Tuscany (YP)
Lorenzo di Credi (1459–1537) (YP) : The Virgin adoring the Child (YP), The Virgin and Child (YP), The Virgin and Child with Two Angels (YP)
Lorenzo Monaco (1370–1423) (YP) : Adoring Saints: Left main tier panel (YP), Adoring Saints: Right main tier panel (YP), Incidents in the Life of Saint Benedict: predella panel (YP), Saint Benedict admitting Saints Maurus and Placidus into the Benedictine Orde (YP), Saint Benedict in the Sacro Speco at Subiaco (YP), The Baptism of Christ (YP)
Lorenzo Veneziano (1356–1372) (YP) : The Madonna of Humility with Saints Mark and John the Baptist (YP)
Claude Lorrain (1604–1682) (YP) : A Seaport (YP), A View in Rome (YP), Landscape with a Goatherd and Goats (YP), Landscape with Aeneas at Delos (YP), Landscape with Cephalus and Procris reunited by Diana (YP), Landscape with David at the Cave of Adullam (YP)
Bernardino Loschi (c.1460–1540) (YP) : Portrait of Alberto Pio (YP)
Johann Carl Loth (1632–1698) (YP) : Mercury piping to Argus (YP)
Lorenzo Lotto (1480–1556) (YP) : Portrait of a Woman inspired by Lucretia (YP), Portrait of Giovanni della Volta with his Wife and Children (YP), The Physician Giovanni Agostino della Torre and his Son, Niccolò (YP), The Virgin and Child with Saints Jerome and Nicholas of Tolentino (YP)
Lodewijck van Ludick (1629–1723) (YP) : A River between Rocky Cliffs, with a Waterfall on the left (YP)
Bernardino Luini (1480–1532) (YP) : Christ (YP), Christ among the Doctors (YP), Saint Catherine (YP), The Virgin and Child (YP), The Virgin and Child with Saint John (YP)
Gerrit Lundens (1622–after 1683) (YP) : The Company of Captain Banning Cocq and Lieutenant Willem van Ruytenburch ('The Nightwatch') (YP)
Isaack Luttichuys  (1616 – 1673) : Portrait of a Girl (YP)
Corneille de Lyon (1505–1575) (YP) : Bust Portrait of a Man (YP), Portrait of a Man (YP), Portrait of a Man (YP), Portrait of a Woman (YP)

M
Gian Francesco de' Maineri (died 1505) (YP) : The Virgin and Child Enthroned between a Soldier Saint, and Saint John the Baptist (La Pala Strozzi) (YP)
Master of 1518 (1518) (YP) : The Crucifixion (YP), The Flight into Egypt (YP), The Visitation of the Virgin to Saint Elizabeth (YP)
Master of the Aachen Altar (active 1480–1520) (YP) : The Crucifixion (YP)
Master of the Albertini (Master of the Casole Fresco) (c 1310–1315) (YP) : The Virgin and Child with Six Angels (YP)
Master of the Bruges Passion Scenes (active 1500) (YP) : Christ presented to the People (YP)
Master of the legend of St. Ursula (Cologne) (1499–1501) (YP) : Saint Lawrence showing the Prefect the Treasures of the Church (YP) and The Virgin and Child with Two Angels (YP)
Master of Cappenberg (1465–died c. 1527) (YP) : Christ before Pilate (YP) and The Coronation of the Virgin (YP)
Master of the Castello Nativity (1445–1475) (YP) : The Nativity (YP)
Master of the Clarisse Panel (active 1285) (YP) : The Virgin and Child (YP)
Master of Delft (b. c.1470 ) (YP) : Christ presented to the People: left-hand panel (YP), The Crucifixion: central panel (YP), The Deposition: right hand panel (YP)
Master of the Female Half-Lengths (1530–1540) (YP) : A Female Head (YP), Saint Christopher carrying the Infant Christ (YP), Saint John on Patmos (YP), The Rest on the Flight into Egypt (YP)
Master of Saint Giles (active around 1500) (YP) : Saint Giles and the Hind (YP) and The Mass of Saint Giles (YP)
Master of the Griselda Legend (active 1490s) (YP) : The Story of Griselda, Part I: Marriage (YP), The Story of Griselda, Part II: Exile (YP), The Story of Griselda, Part III: Reunion (YP)
Master of the Lehman Crucifixion (active 1370s) (YP) : Noli me Tangere (YP)
Master of Liesborn (active 1465) (YP) : Head of Christ Crucified: fragment of the Crucifixion (YP), Saint Dorothy (YP), Saint Margaret (YP), Saints Ambrose, Exuperius and Jerome (YP), Saints Cosmas and Damian and the Virgin: fragment (YP), Saints Gregory, Maurice and Augustine (YP)
Master Of The Life Of The Virgin (1463–1480) (YP) : Saints Augustine, Hubert, Ludger and Gereon (YP), Saints Jerome, Bernard, Giles and Benedict (YP), The Conversion of Saint Hubert: left-hand shutter (YP), The Mass of Saint Hubert: right-hand shutter (YP), The Presentation in the Temple (YP)
Master of the Legend of the Magdalen (c.1483–c.1530 ) (YP) : The Magdalen (YP) and The Magdalen Weeping (YP)
Master of the Mansi Magdalen (1510–1530) (YP) : Judith and the Infant Hercules (YP)
Master of Marradi (active 1480–1500) (YP) : The Story of the Schoolmaster of Falerii (YP)
Master of the Mornauer Portrait (active 1460–1488) (YP) : Portrait of Alexander Mornauer (YP)
Master of the Osservanza Triptych (1430–1450) (YP) : The Birth of the Virgin (YP)
Master of the Pala Sforzesca (c. 1490–c. 1500) (YP) : Saint Paul (YP) and The Virgin and Child with Saints and Donors (YP)
Master of the Prodigal Son (c. 1530–1560) (YP) : The Dead Christ supported by the Virgin and Saint John (YP)
Master of Riglos (active 1435–1460) (YP) : The Crucifixion (YP)
Master of the Blessed Clare of Rimini (ca. 1333–1340) (YP) : Vision of the Blessed Clare of Rimini (YP)
Master of Saint Veronica (1400–1420) (YP) : Saint Veronica with the Sudarium (YP)
Master of the Saint Bartholomew Altarpiece (1465–1510) (YP) : Saints Peter and Dorothy (YP), The Deposition (YP), The Virgin and Child in Glory with Saint James the Great and Saint Cecilia (YP), The Virgin and Child with Musical Angels (YP)
Master of Saint Francis (active 1260–1280) (YP) : Crucifix (YP)
Master of the View of Saint Gudule (1480–1499) (YP) : Portrait of a Young Man (YP)
Master of the Palazzo Venezia Madonna (active 1340–1360) (YP) : Saint Mary Magdalene (YP) and Saint Peter (YP)
Zanobi Machiavelli (c.1418–1479) (YP) : A Bishop Saint and Saint Nicholas of Tolentino (YP), Saint Bartholomew and Saint Monica (YP), Saint John the Baptist and Saint John the Evangelist (YP), Saint Mark and Saint Augustine (YP), The Virgin and Child (YP)
Girolamo Macchietti (1535–1592) (YP) : A Knight of S. Stefano (YP) and The Charity of St Nicholas of Bari (YP)
Raimundo de Madrazo y Garreta (1841–1920) (YP) : Portrait of a Lady (YP)
Nicolaes Maes (1634–1693) (YP) : A Little Girl rocking a Cradle (YP), A Woman scraping Parsnips, with a Child standing by her (YP), Christ blessing the Children (YP), Interior with a Sleeping Maid and her Mistress ('The Idle Servant') (YP), Portrait of a Man in a Black Wig (YP), Portrait of an Elderly Man in a Black Robe (YP)
Antonio Mancini (1852–1930) (YP) : Aurelia (YP), On a Journey (YP), The Customs (YP), The Marquis del Grillo (YP)
Édouard Manet (1832–1883) (YP) : Corner of a Café-Concert (YP), Eva Gonzalès (YP), Music in the Tuileries (YP), The Execution of Emperor Maximilian (YP)
Giovanni di Niccolò Mansueti (1485–1526) (YP) : Symbolic Representation of the Crucifixion (YP)
Andrea Mantegna (1430–1506) (YP) : A Woman Drinking (YP), Noli me Tangere (YP), Samson and Delilah (YP), The Agony in the Garden (YP), The Holy Family with Saint John (YP), The Introduction of the Cult of Cybele at Rome (YP)
Margaritone d'Arezzo (1216–1293) (YP) : The Virgin and Child Enthroned, with Scenes of the Nativity and the Lives of the Saints (YP)
Michele Marieschi (1710–1743) (YP) : Buildings and Figures near a River with Rapids (YP) and Buildings and Figures near a River with Shipping (YP)
Jacob Maris (1837–1899) (YP) : A Beach (YP), A Drawbridge in a Dutch Town (YP), A Girl feeding a Bird in a Cage (YP), A Girl seated outside a House (YP), A Windmill and Houses beside water with a stormy sky (YP), A Young Woman nursing a Baby (YP)
Matthijs Maris (1839–1917) (YP) : Men unloading Carts, Montmartre (YP)
Willem Maris (1844–1910) (YP) : Ducks alighting on a Pool (YP)
Simon Marmion (1420–1489) (YP) : A Choir of Angels: from left-hand shutter (YP), Saint Clement and a Donor (YP), The Soul of Saint Bertin carried up to Go (YP)
Hendrik Martenszoon Sorgh (1610–1670) (YP) : A Woman playing Cards with Two Peasants (YP) and Two Lovers at Table (YP)
Marco Marziale (1492–1507) (YP) : The Circumcision (YP) and The Virgin and Child Enthroned with Saints Gall, John the Baptist, Roch and Bartholomew (YP)
Masaccio (1401–1428) (YP) : Saints Jerome and John the Baptist (YP) and Madonna and Child (Masaccio) (YP)
Masolino da Panicale (1383–1447) (YP) : A Pope (Saint Gregory) and Saint Matthias (YP)
Quentin Matsys (1466–1530) (YP) : A Donor (YP), A Female Figure standing in a Niche (YP), The Ugly Duchess (YP), Christ (YP), Saint Luke painting the Virgin and Child (YP), The Crucifixion (YP)
Massimo Stanzione (1586–1656) (YP) : Monks and Holy Women mourning over the Dead Christ (YP)
Henri Matisse (1869–1954) (YP) : Portrait of Greta Moll (YP)
Matteo di Giovanni (ca. 1430–1495) (YP) : Christ Crowned with Thorns (YP), Saint Sebastian (YP), The Assumption of the Virgin (YP)
Juan Bautista Martínez del Mazo (1612–1667) (YP) : Don Adrián Pulido Pareja (YP) and Queen Mariana of Spain in Mourning (YP)
Damiano Mazza (c1500–1550) (YP) : The Rape of Ganymede (YP)
Filippo Mazzola (c.1460–1505) (YP) : The Virgin and Child with Saint Jerome and the Blessed Bernardino da Feltre (YP)
Ludovico Mazzolino (c.1480–c.1530) (YP) : Christ and the Woman taken in Adultery (YP), Christ disputing with the Doctors (YP), The Holy Family with Saint Francis (YP), The Holy Family with Saint Nicholas of Tolentino (YP), The Nativity (YP)
Jean-Louis-Ernest Meissonier (1815–1891) (YP) : A Man in Black smoking a Pipe (YP)
Luis Egidio Meléndez (1716–1780) (YP) : Still Life with Lemons and Oranges (YP) and Still Life with Oranges and Walnuts (YP)
Altobello Melone (c.1490–before 1543) (YP) : Christ carrying the Cross (YP) and The Road to Emmaus (YP)
Hans Memling (1430–1494) (YP) : A Young Man at Prayer (YP), Saint John the Baptist (YP), Saint John the Baptist (YP), Saint John the Evangelist (YP), Saint Lawrence (YP), The Virgin and Child with an Angel, Saint George and a Donor (YP)
Giusto de' Menabuoi (ca. 1320–1391) (YP) : The Coronation of the Virgin, and Other Scenes (YP)
Adolph Menzel (1815–1905) (YP) : Afternoon in the Tuileries Gardens (YP)
Philippe Mercier (ca. 1689–1760) (YP) : Portrait of a Man (YP)
Gabriël Metsu (1629–1667) (YP) : A Man and a Woman seated by a Virginal (YP), A Woman seated at a Table and a Man tuning a Violin (YP), A Young Woman seated drawing (YP), An Old Woman with a Book (YP), The Interior of a Smithy (YP), Two Men with a Sleeping Woman (YP)
Adam Frans van der Meulen (1632–1690) (YP) : Philippe-François d'Arenberg saluted by the Leader of a Troop of Horsemen (YP)
Georges Michel (1763–1843) (YP) : Landscape with Trees, Buildings and a Road (YP) and Stormy Landscape with Ruins on a Plain (YP)
Michelangelo (1475–1564) (YP) : Leda and the Swan (YP), The Dream of Human Life (YP), The Entombment (Michelangelo) (YP), Manchester Madonna (YP)
Michele da Verona (c.1470–1536/1544) (YP) : Coriolanus persuaded by his Family to spare Rome (YP)
Michiel Jansz. van Mierevelt (1567–1641) (YP) : Portrait of a Woman (YP)
Frans van Mieris the Elder (1635–1681) (YP) : A Woman in a Red Jacket feeding a Parrot (YP), An Old Fiddler (YP), Portrait of the Artist's Wife, Cunera van der Cock (YP), Self Portrait of the Artist, with a Cittern (YP)
Willem van Mieris (1662–1747) (YP) : A Woman and a Fish-pedlar in a Kitchen (YP)
Pierre Mignard (1612–1695) (YP) : The Marquise de Seignelay and Two of her Sons (YP)
Francisque Millet (1642–1679) (YP) : Mountain Landscape with Lightning (YP)
Jean-François Millet (1814–1875) (YP) : Landscape with Buildings (YP), The Whisper (YP), The Winnower (YP)
Girolamo Mocetto (c.1458–1531) (YP) : The Massacre of the Innocents (YP) and The Massacre of the Innocents with Herod (YP)
Pier Francesco Mola (1612–1666) (YP) : Leda and the Swan (YP), Saint John the Baptist preaching in the Wilderness (YP), The Rest on the Flight into Egypt (YP)
Jan Miense Molenaer (1610–1668) (YP) : A Young Man playing a Theorbo and a Young Woman playing a Cittern (YP) and Two Boys and a Girl making Music (YP)
Joos de Momper (1564–1635) (YP) : A Music Party before a Village (YP)
Claude Monet (1840–1926) (YP) : Bathers at La Grenouillère (YP), Flood Waters (YP), Irises (YP), La Pointe de la Hève, Sainte-Addresse (YP), Lavacourt under Snow (YP), Snow Scene at Argenteuil (YP)
Bartolomeo Montagna (c.1450–1523) (YP) : Saint Zeno, Saint John the Baptist and a Female Martyr (YP), The Virgin and Child (YP), The Virgin and Child (YP), The Virgin and Child (YP)
Adolphe Joseph Thomas Monticelli (1824–1886) (YP) : A Vase of Wild Flowers (YP), Conversation Piece (YP), Fountain in a Park (YP), Meeting Place of the Hunt (YP), Still Life of fruit (YP), Still Life with oysters and fish (YP)
Antonis Mor (1520–1576) (YP) : Portrait of a Man (YP)
Luis de Morales (c.1509–1520–c.1586) (YP) : Virgin and Child (YP)
Paolo Moranda Cavazzola (ca. 1486–1522) (YP) : Saint Roch (YP) and The Virgin and Child, Saint John the Baptist and an Angel (YP)
Gustave Moreau (1826–1898) (YP) : St George and the Dragon (YP)
Moretto da Brescia (ca. 1498–1554) (YP) : An Adoring Angel (YP), An Adoring Angel (YP), Christ blessing Saint John the Baptist (YP), Portrait of a Man (YP), Portrait of Count Fortunato Martinengo Cesaresco (YP), Praying Man with a Long Beard (YP)
Berthe Morisot (1841–1895) (YP) : Summer's Day (YP)
Domenico Morone (ca. 1442–ca. 1518) (YP) : The Rape of the Sabines (after the signal) (YP) and The Rape of the Sabines (before the signal) (YP)
Francesco Morone (c.1471–1529) (YP) : Virgin and Child (YP)
Giovanni Battista Moroni (1525–1578) (YP) : Knight with his Jousting Helmet ('Il Cavaliere dal Piede Ferito', Conte Faustino Avogadro) (YP), Bust Portrait of a Young Man with an Inscription (YP), Canon Ludovico di Terzi (YP), Portrait of a Gentleman with his Helmet on a Column Shaft (YP), Portrait of a Lady, perhaps Contessa Lucia Albani Avogadro ('La Dama in Rosso') (YP), Portrait of a Left-Handed Gentleman with Two Quartos and a Letter ('Il Gentile Cavaliere') (YP)
Jan Mostaert (1465–1553) (YP) : Christ Crowned with Thorns (YP) and The Head of Saint John the Baptist, with Mourning Angels and Putti (YP)
Frederik de Moucheron (1633–1686) (YP) : A Landscape with Classical Ruins (YP) and Figures in an Italian Garden with Fountains and Statuary (YP)
Bartolomé Esteban Murillo (1617–1682) (YP) : A Peasant Boy leaning on a Sill (YP), A Young Man Drinking (YP), Christ healing the Paralytic at the Pool of Bethesda (YP), Portrait of Don Justino de Neve (YP), Saint John the Baptist in the Wilderness (YP), Self Portrait (YP)

N
Nardo di Cione (1343–1366) (YP) : Saint John the Baptist with Saint John the Evangelist and Saint James (YP)
Jean-Marc Nattier (1685–1766) (YP) : Manon Balletti (YP) and Portrait of a Man in Armour (YP)
Nazario Nazari (1724–after 1793) (YP) : Andrea Tron (YP)
Pieter Neeffs I (1568–1656) (YP) : View of a Chapel at Evening (YP) and An Evening Service in a Church (YP)
Eglon van der Neer (1634–1703) (YP) : Judith (YP)
Aert van der Neer (1603–1677) (YP) : A Frozen River by a Town at Evening (YP), A Frozen River near a Village, with Golfers and Skaters (YP), A Landscape with a River at Evening (YP), A River Landscape with a Village (YP), A River near a Town, by Moonlight (YP), A View along a River near a Village at Evening (YP)
Caspar Netscher (1639–1684) (YP) : A Lady at a Spinning-wheel (YP), A Lady teaching a Child to read, and a Child playing with a Dog ('La Maîtresse d'école') (YP), A Musical Party (YP), Portrait of a Lady (YP), Portrait of a Lady and a Girl (YP), Portrait of a Young Man (YP)
Nicolas Neufchatel (ca. 1527–1590) (YP) : Portrait of a Young Lady (YP)
Niccolò Alunno (c.1420–1502) (YP) : Christ on the Cross, and Other Scenes (YP)
Niccolò di Buonaccorso (1356–1388) (YP) : The Marriage of the Virgin (YP)
François de Nomé (1593–1644) (YP) : Fantastic Ruins with Saint Augustine and the Child (YP)
Michiel Nouts (1628–1693) (YP) : A Family Group (YP)
Allegretto Nuzi (c.1315–1373) (YP) : Saint Catherine and Saint Bartholomew (YP)

O
Jacob Ochtervelt (1634–1682) (YP) : A Woman playing a Virginal, Another singing and a Man playing a Violin (YP), A Woman standing at a Harpsichord, a Man seated by her (YP), A Young Lady trimming her Fingernails, attended by a Maidservant (YP)
Marco d' Oggiono (c.1475–1530) (YP) : The Virgin and Child (YP)
Jan Olis (1610–1676) (YP) : A Musical Party (YP)
Johann Heinrich Ferdinand Olivier (1785–1841) (YP) : Abraham and Isaac (YP)
Crescenzio Onofri (1632–1698) (YP) : Landscape with Figures (YP) and Landscape with Fishermen (YP)
Jacob van Oost (1603–1671) (YP) : Portrait of a Boy aged 11 (YP) and Two Boys before an Easel (YP)
Pietro di Francesco degli Orioli (1458–1496) (YP) : Scenes from the Passion: predella (YP) and The Nativity with Saints (YP)
Giovanni da Oriolo (d. 1474) (YP) : Leonello d'Este (YP)
Bernard van Orley (1490–1541) (YP) : The Virgin and Child in a Landscape (YP)
Lelio Orsi (1511–1587) (YP) : The Walk to Emmaus (YP)
Ortolano (1485–c.1527) (YP) : Saints Sebastian, Roch and Demetrius (YP)
Jan van Os (1744–1808) (YP) : Dutch Vessels in Calm Water (YP), Fruit and Flowers in a Terracotta Vase (YP), Fruit, Flowers and a Fish (YP)
Georgius Jacobus Johannes van Os (1782–1861) (YP) : Fruit, Flowers and Game (YP)
Adriaen van Ostade (1610–1685) (YP) : A Cobbler (YP), A Peasant courting an Elderly Woman (YP), A Peasant holding a Jug and a Pipe (YP), An Alchemist (YP), The Interior of an Inn with Nine Peasants and a Hurdy-Gurdy Player (YP)
Isaac van Ostade (1621–1649) (YP) : A Farmyard (YP), A Landscape with Peasants and a Cart (YP), A Winter Scene (YP), An Inn by a Frozen River (YP), The Interior of a Barn with Two Peasants (YP), The Outskirts of a Village, with a Horseman (YP)

P
Michael Pacher (ca. 1435–1498) (YP) : The Virgin and Child Enthroned with Angels and Saints (YP)
Padovanino (1588–1649) (YP) : Cornelia and her Sons (YP)
Jacopo Palma il Giovane (1546–1628) (YP) : Mars and Venus (YP)
Palma Vecchio (1479–1528) (YP) : A Blonde Woman (YP), Portrait of a Poet (YP), Saint George and a Female Saint (YP)
Marco Palmezzano (ca. 1459–ca. 1539) (YP) : The Dead Christ in the Tomb, with the Virgin Mary and Saints (YP)
Giovanni Paolo Panini (1691–1765) (YP) : Roman Ruins with Figures (YP), Rome: The interior of St. Peter's (YP), The Lottery in Piazza di Montecitorio (YP)
Paolo da San Leocadio (ca. 1445–ca. 1520) (YP) : The Virgin and Child with Saints (YP)
Paolo Fiammingo (ca. 1540–1596) (YP) : Landscape with a Scene of Enchantment (YP) and Landscape with the Expulsion of the Harpies (YP)
Abraham de Pape (1620–1666) (YP) : Tobit and Anna (YP)
Luis Paret y Alcázar (1746–1799) (YP) : View of El Arenal de Bilbao (YP)
Parmigianino (1503–1540) (YP) : Portrait of a Collector (YP), Vision of Saint Jerome (YP), The Mystic Marriage of Saint Catherine (YP)
Joseph Parrocel (1646–1704) (YP) : The Boar Hunt (YP) and The Return from the Hunt (YP)
Pierre Patel (1605–1676) (YP) : Landscape with the Rest on the Flight into Egypt (YP)
Jean-Baptiste Pater (1695–1736) (YP) : The Dance (YP)
Joachim Patinir (1480–1524) (YP) : Landscape with the Rest on the Flight into Egypt (YP), Saint Jerome in a Rocky Landscape (YP), The Virgin and Child with a Cistercian Nun (YP)
Giovanni Antonio Pellegrini (1675–1741) (YP) : An Allegory of the Marriage of the Elector Palatine (YP) and Rebecca at the Well (YP)
Jean-Baptiste Perronneau (1715–1783) (YP) : Jacques Cazotte (YP)
Pietro Perugino (1446–1523) (YP) : Christ Crowned with Thorns (YP), The Archangel Michael (YP), The Archangel Raphael with Tobias (YP), The Virgin and Child with an Angel (YP), The Virgin and Child with Saint John (YP), The Virgin and Child with Saints Dominic and Catherine of Siena, and Two Donors (YP)
Francesco Pesellino (1422–1457) (YP) : The Story of David and Goliath (YP) and The Triumph of David (YP)
Jean-François Pierre Peyron (1744–1814 ) (YP) : Belisarius receiving Hospitality from a Peasant (YP) and Cornelia, Mother of the Gracchi (YP)
Callisto Piazza (c.1500–1561/1562) (YP) : Portrait of a Man (YP)
Martino Piazza (1475/80–1523) (YP) : Saint John the Baptist in the Desert (YP)
Giovanni Battista Piazzetta (1682–1754) (YP) : The Sacrifice of Isaac (YP)
Pablo Picasso (1881–1973) (YP) : Fruit Dish, Bottle and Violin (YP)
Piero della Francesca (1410–1492) (YP) : Saint Michael (YP), The Baptism of Christ (Piero della Francesca) (YP), The Rosy Wealth of June (YP)
Piero di Cosimo (1462–1521) (YP) : The Death of Procris (YP) and The Fight between the Lapiths and the Centaurs (YP)
Pinturicchio (1452–1513) (YP) : Penelope with the Suitors (YP), Saint Catherine of Alexandria with a Donor (YP), The Virgin and Child (YP)
Pisanello (1395–1455) (YP) : The Virgin and Child with Saints Anthony Abbot and George (YP) and The Vision of Saint Eustace (YP)
Camille Pissarro (1830–1903) (YP) : Fox Hill, Upper Norwood (YP), The Avenue, Sydenham (YP), The Boulevard Montmartre at Night (YP), The Côte des Bœufs at L’Hermitage (YP), The Louvre under Snow (YP), View from Louveciennes (YP)
Giambattista Pittoni (1687–1767) (YP) : The Nativity with God the Father and the Holy Ghost (YP)
Pieter van de Plas (1595–1660) (YP) : Portrait of a Man (YP)
Egbert van der Poel (1621–1664) (YP) : A View of Delft after the Explosion of 1654 (YP)
Cornelius van Poelenburgh (1595–1667) (YP) : A Landscape with the Judgement of Paris (YP) and Women bathing in a Landscape (YP)
Polidoro da Caravaggio (1499–1543) (YP) : A Knight of Saint John (YP) and The Way to Calvary (YP)
Antonio del Pollaiuolo (1433–1498) (YP) : Apollo and Daphne (YP), Martyrdom of Saint Sebastian (YP), The Rosy Wealth of June (YP)
Pontormo (1494–1556) (YP) : Joseph sold to Potiphar (YP), Joseph with Jacob in Egypt (YP), Joseph's Brothers beg for Help (YP), Pharaoh with his Butler and Baker (YP), The Madonna and Child with the Infant Baptist (YP)
Willem de Poorter (1608–1649) (YP) : An Allegorical Subject (The Just Ruler) (YP)
Il Pordenone (1483–1539) (YP) : Saint Bonaventure (YP) and Saint Louis of Toulouse (YP)
Giuseppe Porta (1520–1575) (YP) : Justice (YP)
Hendrik Gerritsz Pot (1585–1657) (YP) : A Merry Company at Table (YP)
Paulus Potter (1625–1654) (YP) : A Landscape with Cows, Sheep and Horses by a Barn (YP) and Cattle and Sheep in a Stormy Landscape (YP)
Nicolas Poussin (1594–1665) (YP) : A Bacchanalian Revel before a Term (YP): Cephalus and Aurora (YP): Landscape with a Man killed by a Snake (YP): Landscape with a Man scooping Water from a Stream (YP): Landscape with a Man washing his Feet at a Fountain (YP), Landscape with Travellers Resting (YP) : The Adoration of the Golden Calf
Pierre-Charles Poussin (1819–1904) (YP) : Pardon Day in Brittany (YP)
Giovanni Ambrogio de Predis (c.1455–after 1508 ) (YP) : Profile Portrait of a Lady (YP)
Gregorio Preti (1603–1672) (YP) : Christ disputing with the Doctors (YP)
Mattia Preti (1613–1699) (YP) : The Marriage at Cana (YP)
Andrea Previtali (1480–1528) (YP) : Christ Blessing (YP), Salvator Mundi (YP): Scenes from Tebaldeo's Eclogues: Damon broods on his unrequited love (YP), Scenes from Tebaldeo's Eclogues: Thyrsis asks Damon (YP): The Virgin and Child adored by Two Angels (YP), The Virgin and Child with a Shoot of Olive (YP)
Jan Provoost (1462–1529) (YP) : The Virgin and Child in a Landscape (YP)
Scipione Pulzone (1544–1598) (YP) : Portrait of a Cardinal (YP)
Pierre Puvis de Chavannes (1824–1898) (YP) : A Maid combing a Woman's Hair (YP), Death and the Maidens (YP), Summer (YP), The Beheading of Saint John the Baptist (YP)
Jacob Pynas (1592–1650) (YP) : Mountain Landscape with Narcissus (YP)

Q
Pieter Quast (1606–1647) (YP) : A Man and a Woman in a Stableyard (YP) and A Standing Man (YP)

R
Henry Raeburn (1756–1823) (YP) : Robert Ferguson of Raith 1770–1840 and Lieutenant-General Sir Ronald Ferguson 1773–1841 ('The Archers') (YP)
Raffaellino del Garbo (1470–1524) (YP)  : Portrait of a Man (YP), The Virgin and Child with the Magdalen and Saint Catherine of Alexandria (YP), The Virgin and Child with Two Angels (YP)
Abraham Ragueneau (1623–1690) (YP) : Portrait of a Young Man in Grey (YP)
Raphael (1483–1520) (YP) : Vision of a Knight (YP), Portrait of a Young Man (YP), Portrait of Pope Julius II (YP), Saint Catherine of Alexandria (YP), Saint John the Baptist Preaching (YP), Mond Crucifixion (YP)
Rembrandt (1606–1669) (YP) : A Bearded Man in a Cap (YP), A Franciscan Friar (YP), A Man seated reading at a Table in a Lofty Room (YP), A Seated Man with a Stick (YP), A Study of an Elderly Man in a Cap (YP), A Woman Bathing in a Stream (YP), The Woman Taken in Adultery
Pierre-Auguste Renoir (1841–1919) (YP) : A Bather (YP), A Nymph by a Stream (YP), At the Theatre (La Première Sortie) (YP), Dancing Girl with Castanets (YP), Dancing Girl with Tambourine (YP), Lakeside Landscape (YP)
Gabriel Revel (1643–1712) (YP) : Portrait of an Astronomer (YP)
Marinus van Reymerswaele (1490–1546) (YP) : Two Tax Gatherers (YP)
Joshua Reynolds (1723–1792) (YP) : Anne, 2nd Countess of Albemarle (YP), Captain Robert Orme (YP), Colonel Tarleton (YP), Lady Cockburn and Her Three Eldest Sons (YP), Lord Heathfield of Gibraltar (YP)
Guido Reni (1575–1642) (YP) : Christ embracing Saint John the Baptist (YP), Head of Christ Crowned with Thorns (YP), Lot and his Daughters leaving Sodom (YP), Perseus and Andromeda (YP), Saint Jerome (YP), Saint Mary Magdalene (YP)
Francisco Ribalta (1565–1628) (YP) : The Vision of Father Simón (YP)
Jusepe de Ribera (1590–1656) (YP) : An Apostle (YP), Jacob with the Flock of Laban (YP), The Lamentation over the Dead Christ (YP)
Louis Gustave Ricard (1823–1873) (YP) : Portrait of a Man (YP) and The Countess of Desart as a Child (YP)
Sebastiano Ricci (1659–1734) (YP) : Bacchus and Ariadne (YP) and Esther before Ahasuerus (YP)
Hyacinthe Rigaud (1659–1743) (YP) : Antoine Pâris (YP) and Cardinal Fleury (YP)
Ercole de' Roberti (1450–1469) (YP) : The Adoration of the Shepherds (YP), The Dead Christ (YP), The Institution of the Eucharist (YP), The Israelites gathering Manna (YP)
Roelant Roghman (1627–1692) (YP) : A Mountainous Landscape (YP)
Girolamo Romani (c.1484–c.1560) (YP) : Pegasus and the Muses (YP), Saint Alexander (YP), Saint Filippo Benizzi (YP), Saint Gaudioso (YP), Saint Jerome (YP), The Nativity (YP)
Johann Heinrich Roos (1631–1685) (YP) : Still Life of Fruit and Vegetables with Two Monkeys (YP)
Salvator Rosa (1615–1673) (YP) : A Coastal Scene (YP), An Angel appears to Hagar and Ishmael in the Desert (YP), Landscape with Mercury and the Dishonest Woodman (YP), Landscape with Tobias and the Angel (YP), Mountainous Landscape with Figures (YP), Philosophy (YP)
Alexander Roslin (1718–1793) (YP) : The Dauphin, Louis de France (YP)
Rosso Fiorentino (1494–1541) (YP) : Portrait of a Young Man holding a Letter (YP)
Hans Rottenhammer (1564–1625) (YP) : The Coronation of the Virgin (YP)
Henri Rousseau (1844–1910) (YP) : Tiger in a Tropical Storm (YP)
Philippe Rousseau (1816–1887) (YP) : A Valley (YP), Still Life with Oysters (YP), The Fish Market (YP)
Théodore Rousseau (1812–1867) (YP) : A Rocky Landscape (YP), Landscape (YP), Moonlight: The bathers (YP), River Scene (YP), Sunset in the Auvergne (YP), The Valley of Saint-Vincent (YP)
Peter Paul Rubens (1577–1640) (YP) : A Landscape with a Shepherd and his Flock (YP), A Lion Hunt (YP), A Roman Triumph (YP), A Shepherd with his Flock in a Woody Landscape (YP), A Wagon fording a Stream (YP), An Allegory showing the Effects of War ('The Horrors of War') (YP)
Jacob Isaacksz van Ruisdael (1628–1682) (YP) : A Bleaching Ground in a Hollow by a Cottage (YP), A Castle on a Hill by a River (YP), A Cottage and a Hayrick by a River (YP), A Landscape with a Ruined Building at the Foot of a Hill by a River (YP), A Landscape with a Ruined Castle and a Church (YP), A Landscape with a Waterfall and a Castle on a Hill (YP)
Jacob Salomonsz van Ruysdael (1629–1681) (YP) : A Waterfall by a Cottage in a Hilly Landscape (YP)
Salomon van Ruysdael (1602–1670) (YP) : A Landscape with a Carriage and Horsemen at a Pool (YP), A River Landscape with Fishermen (YP), A River with Fishermen drawing a Net (YP), A View of Deventer seen from the North-West (YP), A View of Rhenen seen from the West (YP), River Scene (YP)
Rachel Ruysch (1664–1750) (YP) : Flowers in a Vase (YP)
Marten Ryckaert (1587–1631) (YP) : Landscape with Satyrs (YP)
Théo van Rysselberghe (1862–1926) (YP) : Coastal Scene (YP)

S
Andrea Sacchi (1599–1661) (YP) : Saints Anthony Abbot and Francis of Assisi (YP)
Pier Francesco Sacchi (c.1485–1528) (YP) : Saint Paul Writing (YP)
Pieter Jansz. Saenredam (1597–1665) (YP) : The Interior of the Buurkerk at Utrecht (YP) and The Interior of the Grote Kerk at Haarlem (YP)
Herman Saftleven the younger (1609–1685) (YP) : Christ teaching from Saint Peter's Boat on the Lake of Gennesaret (YP)
Gabriel-Jacques Saint-Aubin (1724–1780) (YP) : A Street Show in Paris (YP)
Lorenzo d'Alessandro da Sanseverino (1440/1450–1503) (YP) : The Marriage of Saint Catherine of Siena (YP)
Girolamo da Santacroce (1492–1537) (YP) : A Saint with a Fortress and a Banner (YP) and A Youthful Saint Reading (YP)
Giovanni Santi (ca. 1435–1494) (YP) : The Virgin and Child (YP)
Dirck van Santvoort (1610–1680) (YP) : Portrait of Geertruyt Spiegel with a Finch (YP)
Philip Santvoort (1688–1708) (YP) : The Rape of Tamar by Amnon (YP)
Carlo Saraceni (1579–1620) (YP) : Moses defending the Daughters of Jethro (YP)
John Singer Sargent (1856–1925) (YP) : Lord Ribblesdale (YP), Wineglasses 
Andrea del Sarto (1486–1530) (YP) : Portrait of a Young Man (YP) and The Madonna and Child with Saint Elizabeth and Saint John the Baptist (YP)
Giovanni Battista Salvi da Sassoferrato (1609–1685) (YP) : The Baptism of Christ (YP), The Virgin and Child Embracing (YP), The Virgin in Prayer (YP)
Roelant Savery (1576–1639) (YP) : Orpheus (YP)
Girolamo Savoldo (c.1480–c.1548) (YP) : Mary Magdalene (YP) and Saint Jerome (YP)
Vittore Carpaccio (1465–1527) (YP) : The Departure of Ceyx (YP)
Cornelis Symonsz van der Schalcke (1617–1671) (YP) : An Extensive River Landscape, with Two Sportsmen and their Greyhounds (YP)
Godfried Schalcken (1643–1706) (YP) : A Candlelight Scene: A man offering a gold chain and coins (YP), A Woman singing and a Man with a Cittern (YP), Allegory of Virtue and Riches (YP), An Old Woman scouring a Pot (YP)
Ary Scheffer (1795–1858) (YP) : Mrs Robert Hollond (YP) and Saints Augustine and Monica (YP)
Giorgio Schiavone (1436/1437–1504) (YP) : A Female Saint (YP), Saint Anthony of Padua (YP), Saint Bernardino (YP), Saint Catherine (YP), Saint Jerome (YP), Saint John the Baptist (YP)
Andrea Schiavone (ca. 1510–1563) (YP) : Arcas Hunting (YP) and Jupiter seducing Callisto (YP)
Julius Schnorr Von Carolsfeld (1794–1872) (YP) : Ruth in Boaz's Field (YP)
Otto Scholderer (1834–1902) (YP) : Lilac (YP) and Portrait of the Artist's Wife (YP)
Martin Schongauer (1440–1491) (YP) : The Virgin and Child in a Garden (YP)
Heinrich Wilhelm Schweickhardt (1747–1797) (YP) : Cattle (YP)
Jan van Scorel (1495–1562) (YP) : A Man with a Pansy and a Skull (YP)
Hercules Seghers (1589–1638) (YP) : A Mountainous Landscape (YP)
Segna di Bonaventura (doc. 1298–ca. 1331) (YP) : Crucifix (YP)
Jakob Seisenegger (1504/05–1567) (YP) : Portrait of a Girl (YP)
Georges Seurat (1859–1891) (YP) : Bathers at Asnières (YP), Bathers at Asnières (YP), Study for 'Bathers at Asnières' (YP), Study for 'La Grande Jatte' (YP), Study for 'La Grande Jatte' (YP), The Channel of Gravelines, Grand Fort-Philippe (YP)
Martin Archer Shee (1769–1850) (YP) : Mr Lewis as the Marquis in 'The Midnight Hour' (YP)
Jan Siberechts (1627–1703) (YP) : A Cowherd passing a Horse and Cart in a Stream (YP)
Luca Signorelli (1441–1523) (YP) : Coriolanus persuaded by his Family to spare Rome (YP), Esther before Ahasuerus, and Three Episodes from the Life of Saint Jerome (YP), The Adoration of the Shepherds (YP), The Adoration of the Shepherds (YP), The Circumcision (Signorelli) (YP), The Holy Family (YP)
Telemaco Signorini (1835–1901) (YP) : Sketch for 'Straw Weavers at Settignano' (YP)
Francesco Simonini (1686–c.1755) (YP) : A Campaign Scene (YP)
Alfred Sisley (1839–1899) (YP) : The Watering Place at Marly-le-Roi (YP)
Pieter Snyers (1681–1752) (YP) : A Still Life with Fruit, Vegetables, Dead Chickens and a Lobster (YP)
Il Sodoma (1477–1549) (YP) : Head of Christ (YP), Saint Jerome in Penitence (YP), The Madonna and Child (YP), The Madonna and Child with Saints Peter and Catherine of Siena and a Carthusian Donor (YP), The Nativity with the Infant Baptist and Shepherds (YP)
Giovanni Antonio Sogliani (1492–1544) (YP) : The Madonna and Child (YP)
Andrea Solari (c.1465–1524) (YP) : A Man with a Pink (YP), Giovanni Cristoforo Longoni (YP), The Virgin and Child (YP)
Antonio Solario (1502–1514) (YP) : Saint Catherine of Alexandria (YP), Saint Ursula (YP), The Virgin and Child with Saint John (YP)
Francesco Solimena (1657–1743) (YP) : An Allegory of Louis XIV (YP) and Dido receiving Aeneas and Cupid disguised as Ascanius (YP)
Lo Spagna (d. 1529) (YP) : Christ at Gethsemane (YP) and The Agony in the Garden (YP)
Giovanni Martino Spanzotti (1456–1526) (YP) : Saint Peter Martyr and a Bishop Saint (probably Saint Evasio) (YP) and Saints Nicholas of Tolentino and John the Baptist (YP)
Giovanni Battista Spinelli (active from ca. 1630-ca. 1660) (YP) : The Adoration of the Shepherds (YP)
Bartholomeus Spranger (1546–1611) (YP) : The Adoration of the Kings (YP)
Johannes Spruyt (1627–1671) (YP) : Geese and Ducks (YP)
Gherardo Starnina (1354–1409) (YP) : The Beheading of Saint Margaret (YP)
Jan Steen (1626–1679) (YP) : A Man blowing Smoke at a Drunken Woman, Another Man with a Wine-pot (YP), A Peasant Family at Meal-time ('Grace before Meat') (YP), A Pedlar selling Spectacles outside a Cottage (YP), A Young Woman playing a Harpsichord to a Young Man (YP), An Interior with a Man offering an Oyster to a Woman (YP), An Itinerant Musician saluting Two Women in a Kitchen (YP)
Harmen Steenwijck (1612–1656) (YP) : Still life: An Allegory of the Vanities of Human Life 
Hendrik van Steenwijk II (1580–1649) (YP) : The Interior of a Gothic Church looking East (YP), A Man kneels before a Woman in the Courtyard of a Renaissance Palace (YP), Croesus and Solon (YP), Interior of a Church at Night (YP), The Interior of a Gothic Church looking East (YP), The Interior of a Gothic Church looking East (YP)
Stefano di Giovanni (1374–1451) (YP) : Saint Francis before the Pope: the Granting of the Indulgence (YP), Saint Francis before the Sultan (YP), Saint Francis meets a Knight Poorer than Himself and Saint Francis's Vision of the Founding of the Franciscan Order (YP), Saint Francis renounces his Earthly Father (YP), The Funeral of Saint Francis and Verification of the Stigmata (YP), The Stigmatisation of Saint Francis (YP)
Alfred Stevens (1823–1906 ) (YP) : Storm at Honfleur (YP)
Abraham Storck (1644–1708) (YP) : A River View (YP)
Bernardo Strozzi (1581–1644) (YP) : A Personification of Fame (YP)
Zanobi Strozzi (1412–1468) (YP) : The Abduction of Helen (YP), The Adoration of the Magi (YP), The Annunciation (YP)
George Stubbs (1724–1806) (YP) : A Gentleman driving a Lady in a Phaeton (YP), Sir Peniston and Lady Lamb, Later Lord and Lady Melbourne, with Lady Lamb's Father, Sir Ralph Milbanke, and Her Brother John Milbanke ('The Milbanke and Melbourne Families') (YP), Whistlejacket (YP)
Pierre Subleyras (1699–1749) (YP) : Diana and Endymion (YP) and The Barque of Charon (YP)
Justus Sustermans (1597–1681) (YP) : Double Portrait of the Grand Duke Ferdinand II of Tuscany and his Wife Vittoria della Rovere (YP) and Portrait of a Man (YP)
Lambert Sustris (1515–1591) (YP) : The Queen of Sheba before King Solomon (YP)

T
Francesco Tacconi (active 1464–1490) (YP) : The Virgin and Child (YP)
Jean-Joseph Taillasson (1745–1809) (YP) : Virgil reading the Aeneid to Augustus and Octavia (YP)
David Teniers the Younger (1610–1690) (YP) : A Cottage by a River with a Distant View of a Castle (YP), A Country Festival near Antwerp (YP), A Doctor tending a Patient's Foot in his Surgery (YP), A Gipsy telling a Peasant his Fortune in a Hilly Landscape (YP), A Man holding a Glass and an Old Woman lighting a Pipe (YP), A View of a Village with Three Peasants talking in the Foreground (YP)
Giovanni Battista Tiepolo (1696–1770) (YP) : A Vision of the Trinity appearing to Pope Saint Clement (YP), An Allegory with Venus and Time (YP), Rinaldo turning in Shame from the Magic Shield (YP), Saints Augustine, Louis of France, John the Evangelist and a Bishop Saint (YP), Saints Maximus and Oswald (YP), Seated Man, Woman with Jar, and Boy (YP)
Giovanni Domenico Tiepolo (1727–1804) (YP) : The Building of the Trojan Horse (YP), The Lamentation at the Foot of the Cross (YP), The Lamentation at the Foot of the Cross (YP), The Marriage of Frederick Barbarossa and Beatrice of Burgundy (YP), The Procession of the Trojan Horse into Troy (YP)
Tintoretto (1518–1594) (YP) : Christ Washing the Disciples' Feet (YP), Jupiter and Semele (YP), Portrait of Vincenzo Morosini (YP), Saint George and the Dragon (YP), The Miracle of Saint Mark (YP), The Nativity (YP), The Origin of the Milky Way
Domenico Tintoretto (1560–1635) (YP) : Portrait of a Gentleman (YP)
Titian (1485–1576) (YP) : A Boy with a Bird (YP), A Concert (YP), A Man with a Quilted Sleeve (YP), Allegory of Prudence (YP), Bacchus and Ariadne (YP), Diana and Actaeon (Titian) (YP), Noli me tangere
Louis Tocqué (1696–1772) (YP) : Jean Michel de Grilleau (YP), Portrait of a Man (YP), Portrait of Mademoiselle de Coislin (YP)
Michele Tosini (1503–1577) (YP) : Charity (YP)
Henri de Toulouse-Lautrec (1864–1901) (YP) : Woman seated in a Garden (YP)
Jan Jansz. Treck (1605–1652) (YP) : Still Life with a Pewter Flagon and Two Ming Bowls (YP), Vanitas Still Life (YP)
Jean François de Troy (1679–1752) (YP) : Jason swearing Eternal Affection to Medea (YP), The Capture of the Golden Fleece (YP), The Game of Pied de Bœuf (YP), Time unveiling Truth (YP)
Charles-Philogène Tschaggeny (1815–1894) (YP) : An Episode on the Field of Battle (YP)
Cosmè Tura (ca. 1430–1495) (YP) : A Muse (Calliope) (YP), Saint Jerome (YP), The Virgin and Child Enthroned (YP), The Virgin Annunciate (YP)
J. M. W. Turner (1775–1851) (YP) : Calais Pier, with French Poissards preparing for Sea: : an English Packet arriving (YP), Dido building Carthage (YP), Margate, from the Sea (YP), Rain, Steam and Speed – The Great Western Railway (YP), Sun rising through vapour with fishermen (YP), The Evening Star (YP)

U
Paolo Uccello (1396–1475) (YP) : The Battle of San Romano (YP) and Saint George and the Dragon (Uccello) (YP)
Ugolino di Nerio (1295–1347) (YP) : David (YP), Isaiah (YP), Moses (YP), Saint Bartholomew and Saint Andrew (YP), Saint Simon and Saint Thaddeus (Jude) (YP), The Betrayal of Christ (YP)
Moses van Uyttenbroeck (1590–1648) (YP) : Landscape with Mythological Figures (YP)

V
Wallerant Vaillant (1623–1677) (YP) : A Boy seated Drawing (YP)
Valentin de Boulogne (1591–1632) (YP) : The Four Ages of Man (YP)
Jacques Antoine Vallin (c.1760–after 1831) (YP) : Dr Forlenze (YP)
Vincent van Gogh (1853–1890) (YP) : Wheat Field with Cypresses (YP), Long Grass with Butterflies (YP), Sunflowers (Van Gogh series) (YP), Van Gogh's Chair (YP)
Diego Velázquez (1599–1660) (YP) : Christ after the Flagellation contemplated by the Christian Soul (YP), Christ in the House of Martha and Mary (Velázquez) (YP), Philip IV hunting Wild Boar (La Tela Real) (YP), Philip IV of Spain (YP), Philip IV in Brown and Silver (YP), Portrait of Archbishop Fernando de Valdés (YP)
Adriaen van de Velde (1636–1672) (YP) : A Bay Horse, a Cow, a Goat and Three Sheep near a Building (YP), A Farm with a Dead Tree (YP), A Goat and a Kid (YP), A Landscape with a Farm by a Stream (YP), Golfers on the Ice near Haarlem (YP), Peasants with Cattle fording a Stream (YP)
Esaias van de Velde (1587–1630) (YP) : A Winter Landscape (YP)
Willem van de Velde the Younger (1633–1707) (YP) : A Dutch Ship, a Yacht and Smaller Vessels in a Breeze (YP), A Dutch Ship and Other Small Vessels in a Strong Breeze (YP), A Dutch Vessel in a Strong Breeze (YP), A Dutch Yacht surrounded by Many Small Vessels, saluting as Two Barges pull alongside (YP), A Small Dutch Vessel close-hauled in a Strong Breeze (YP), An English Vessel and Dutch Ships Becalmed (YP)
Jan Jansz van de Velde (1620–1662) (YP) : Still Life: A goblet of wine, oysters and lemons (YP)
Jacob Jansz van Velsen (1597–1656) (YP) : A Musical Party (YP)
Antonio da Vendri (1476–1555) (YP) : The Giusti Family of Verona (YP)
Marcello Venusti (c.1512–1579 ) (YP) : The Holy Family (Il Silenzio) (YP) and The Purification of the Temple (YP)
Pieter Cornelisz Verbeeck (1610–1654) (YP) : A White Horse standing by a Sleeping Man (YP)
Johannes Vermeer (1632–1675) (YP) : Lady Seated at a Virginal (YP) and Lady Standing at a Virginal (YP)
Andries Vermeulen (1763–1814) (YP) : A Scene on the Ice (YP)
Jan Cornelisz Vermeyen (1500–1559) (YP) : A Man holding a Coloured Medal (YP)
Claude Joseph Vernet (1714–1789) (YP) : A Landscape at Sunset with Fishermen returning with their Catch , A River with Fishermen (YP), A Sea-Shore (YP), A Seaport (YP), A Shipwreck in Stormy Seas (YP), A Sporting Contest on the Tiber at Rome (YP)
Horace Vernet (1789–1863) (YP) : The Battle of Hanau (YP), The Battle of Jemappes (YP), The Battle of Montmirail (YP), The Battle of Valmy (YP), The Emperor Napoleon I (YP)
Bonifazio Veronese (1487–1553) (YP) : A Huntsman (YP), Dives and Lazarus (YP), The Madonna and Child with Saints James the Greater, Jerome, the Infant Baptist and Catherine of Alexandria (YP), The Madonna and Child with Saints John the Baptist, Elizabeth and Catherine of Alexandria (YP)
Paolo Veronese (1528–1588) (YP) : Christ addressing a Kneeling Woman (YP), The Allegory of Love (YP), Respect (YP), Scorn (YP), Adoration of the Magi (YP), The Consecration of Saint Nicholas (YP), The Conversion of Mary Magdalene
Andrea del Verrocchio (1435–1488) (YP) : Madonna of the Milk (YP) and Tobias and the Angel (YP)
Hendrik Verschuring (1627–1690) (YP) : Cavalry attacking a Fortified Place (YP)
Gerolamo da Vicenza (active 1488) (YP) : The Dormition and Assumption of the Virgin (YP)
Jan Victors (1619–1676) (YP) : A Village Scene with a Cobbler (YP)
Louise Élisabeth Vigée Le Brun (1755–1842) (YP) : Mademoiselle Brongniart (YP) and Self Portrait in a Straw Hat (YP)
Sebastiano del Piombo (1485–1547) (YP) : Portrait of a Lady with the Attributes of Saint Agatha (YP), The Daughter of Herodias (YP), The Madonna and Child with Saint Joseph, Saint John the Baptist and a Donor (YP), The Raising of Lazarus (Sebastiano del Piombo) (YP)
Giovanni Battista Viola (1576–1622 ) (YP) : Landscape with a Hunting Party (YP) and Landscape with a River and Boats (YP)
Bartolomeo Vivarini (1432–1499) (YP) : Portrait of a Man (YP) and The Virgin and Child with Saints Paul and Jerome (YP)
Alvise Vivarini (1445–1503) (YP) : The Virgin and Child (YP)
Antonio Vivarini (1415–1476) (YP) : Saints Francis and Mark (YP) and Saints Peter and Jerome (YP)
Simon de Vlieger (1600–1653) (YP) : A Dutch Man-of-war and Various Vessels in a Breeze (YP) and A View of an Estuary, with Dutch Vessels at a Jetty and a Dutch Man-of-War at Anchor (YP)
Willem van der Vliet (1584–1642) (YP) : Portrait of Suitbertus Purmerent (YP)
Jacob Ferdinand Voet (1639–1689) (YP) : Cardinal Carlo Cerri (YP) and Cardinal de Retz (YP)
Simon de Vos (1603–1676) (YP) : The Raising of Lazarus (YP)
Simon Vouet (1590–1649) (YP) : Ceres and Harvesting Cupids (YP)
Roelof Jansz van Vries (1630–1690) (YP) : A View of a Village (YP)
Cornelis Vroom (1591–1661) (YP) : A Landscape with a River by a Wood (YP)
Édouard Vuillard (1868–1940) (YP) : Madame André Wormser and her Children (YP), The Mantelpiece (La Cheminée) (YP), The Terrace at Vasouy, the Garden (YP), The Terrace at Vasouy, the Lunch (YP)

W
Jacob van Walscapelle (1644–1727) (YP) : Flowers in a Glass Vase (YP)
Antoine Watteau (1684–1721) (YP) : Perfect Harmony (YP) and The Scale of Love (YP)
Jan Baptist Weenix (1621–1661) (YP) : A Huntsman cutting up a Dead Deer, with Two Deerhounds (YP)
Jan Weenix (1640–1719) (YP) : A Deerhound with Dead Game and Implements of the Chase (YP) and An Italian Courtyard (YP)
Jacob Weier (d. 1670) (YP) : Cavalry attacked by Infantry (YP)
Adriaen van der Werff (1659–1722) (YP) : A Boy with a Mousetrap (YP), Portrait of a Man in a Quilted Gown (YP), The Rest on the Flight into Egypt (YP)
Hans Wertinger (c.1465–1533) (YP) : Summer (YP)
Jacob Willemszoon de Wet (1610–1675) (YP) : A Landscape with a River at the Foot of a Hill (YP)
Rogier van der Weyden (1400–1464) (YP) : A Man Reading (Saint Ivo?) (YP), Christ appearing to the Virgin (YP), Pietà (YP), Portrait of a Lady (YP), The Exhumation of Saint Hubert (YP), The Magdalen Reading (YP)
Jan Wijnants (1632–1684) (YP) : A Landscape with a Dead Tree, and a Peasant driving Oxen and Sheep along a Road (YP), A Landscape with a High Dune and Peasants on a Road (YP), A Landscape with a Woman driving Sheep through a Ruined Archway (YP), A Landscape with Two Dead Trees, and Two Sportsmen with Dogs on a Sandy Road (YP), A Track by a Dune, with Peasants and a Horseman (YP), Peasants driving Cattle and Sheep by a Sandhill, and Two Sportsmen with Dogs (YP)
Richard Wilson (1713/1714–1782 ) (YP) : Holt Bridge on the River Dee (YP) and The Valley of the Dee, with Chester in the Distance (YP)
Emanuel de Witte (1617–1692) (YP) : Adriana van Heusden and her Daughter at the New Fishmarket in Amsterdam (YP), The Interior of the Oude Kerk, Amsterdam, during a Sermon (YP), The Interior of the Oude Kerk, Amsterdam, during a Sermon (YP)
Frans Wouters (1612–1659) (YP) : Nymphs surprised by Satyrs (YP)
Philips Wouwerman (1619–1668) (YP) : A Dune Landscape with a River and Many Figures (YP), A Horse being Shod outside a Village Smithy (YP), A Stag Hunt (YP), A Stream in the Dunes, with Two Bathers (YP), A View on a Seashore with Fishwives offering Fish to a Horseman (YP), A White Horse, and an Old Man binding Faggots (YP)
Jan Wouwerman (1629–1666) (YP) : A Landscape with a Farm on the Bank of a River (YP)
Joseph Wright of Derby (1734–1797) (YP) : An Experiment on a Bird in the Air Pump (YP) and Mr and Mrs Thomas Coltman (YP)
Joachim Wtewael (1566–1638) (YP) : The Judgement of Paris (YP)

Z
Bernardino Zaganelli (1465–1511) (YP) : Saint Sebastian (YP)
Francesco da Cotignola (1475–1531) (YP) : The Baptism of Christ (YP) and The Dead Christ with Angels (YP)
Giuseppe Zais (1709–1781) (YP) : Landscape with a Group of Figures (YP), Landscape with a Group of Figures Fishing (YP), Landscape with a Ruined Tower (YP)
Johann Zoffany (1733–1810) (YP) : Mrs Oswald (YP)
Marco Zoppo (1433–1478) (YP) : A Bishop Saint, perhaps Saint Augustine (YP) and The Dead Christ supported by Saints (YP)
Francesco Zuccarelli (1702–1788) (YP) : Landscape with Cattle and Figures (YP)
Francesco Zugno (1709–1787) (YP) : The Finding of Moses (YP)
Francisco de Zurbarán (1598–1664) (YP) : A Cup of Water and a Rose (YP), Saint Francis in Meditation (YP), Saint Francis in Meditation (YP), Saint Margaret of Antioch (YP)

References

National Gallery London on the Your Paintings website
 Collection overview on website of the National Gallery, London
 Netherlands Institute for Art History

 
Lists of painters
National Gallery, London
Lists of paintings
London-related lists